= Queens Wharf, Auckland =

Concrete wharf in Auckland, New Zealand

Coordinates: 36.8412°S 174.7682°E

Queens Wharf is a concrete wharf in Auckland, New Zealand, that continues off Queen Street (the main street in central Auckland). It opened in 1913, replacing the Queen Street Wharf, a succession of wooden wharves first built in 1852. Queens Wharf was owned and used by Ports of Auckland until 2010.

== Location and description ==
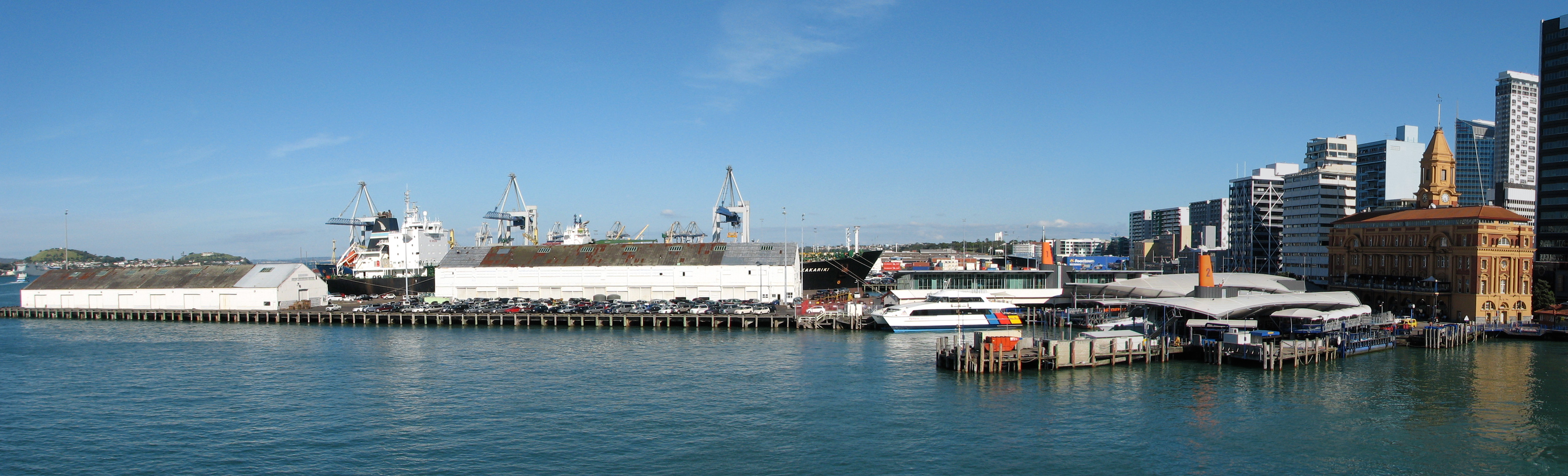
Queens Wharf in 2007. The two white sheds date back to 1911 and 1914.

The wharf runs north-northeast into Waitematā Harbour from the intersection of Quay Street and Queen Street on Auckland's waterfront. It is near Auckland's historic Ferry Building, and lies parallel to the nearby Princes Wharf (to the west) and Captain Cook Wharf (east).

The present wharf is constructed of concrete, and covers an area of 2.9 hectares. It is 350 metres long by 85 metres wide, and is 3 metres above sea level. Up until 2010, two sheds (built in 1911 and 1914) stood on the wharf. Shed 11 at the far end of the wharf was dismantled in late 2010. This shed was replaced by The Cloud which was used as a place of congregation for the Rugby World Cup 2011. Shed 10 remains but was heavily refurbished for the World Cup.

== History ==
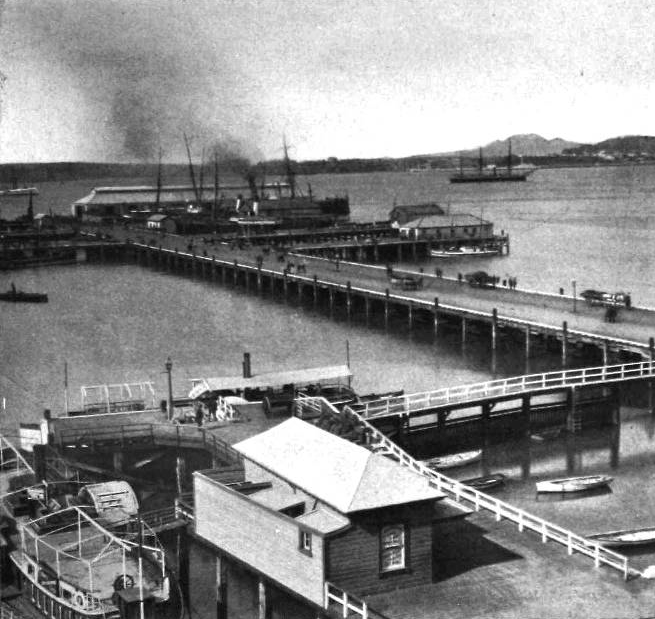
Queen Street Wharf with its projecting tees (from La Nouvelle-Zélande, 1904)

Construction of the first Queen Street Wharf, a wooden wharf, began in 1852. It was the second public pier for the city of Auckland, after the Wynyard Pier in Mechanics Bay to the east. It was extended to a length of 1,555 feet (474 m), with projecting berthing tees, by 1864. By 1871 it was dilapidated and the surrounding harbour was too shallow, so a newer, longer and wider timber wharf was constructed.

The Queen Street Wharf was replaced by Queens Wharf, a ferro-concrete finger wharf built in stages (so as not to disrupt wharf operations) along with an adjacent ferry jetty, from 1907 to 1913. It soon became the main overseas passenger wharf for Auckland. Soon after completion, the 1913 Great Strike began. While the wharf labourers were on strike, young farmers from outside of the city, known as Massey's Cossacks, worked and protected the docks. In 1960, passenger services were transferred to the neighbouring Princes Wharf.

The wharf and its sheds were used for cargo by Ports of Auckland (POAL) until 2010. The deck of the wharf was often used for parking import vehicles. The northwestern shed was used as a cool store, and the southeastern was used by POAL and MAF for storage and customs processing.

The wharf was sold to Auckland Regional Council and the New Zealand Government, who each paid $20 million to Ports of Auckland, in 2010. It was transformed to act as "Party Central" for the 2011 Rugby World Cup. A competition to outline a plan for renewing of the wharf for the Rugby World Cup and beyond began on 24 August 2009. After strong criticism of the quality of the designs from many sources (including Auckland Mayor John Banks), the competition took a back foot and the winner never announced. After the failure of the design competition, a temporary multifunction building was created. At a cost of about $10 million, The Cloud was built, which is a long wave-shaped structure.

== Port Future ==
The area is currently managed by Panuku Development Auckland and further changes depend upon the results of a "Port Future" report expected to take until mid 2016.
