= McCallum Brothers =

New Zealand-based sand and construction aggregate supplier

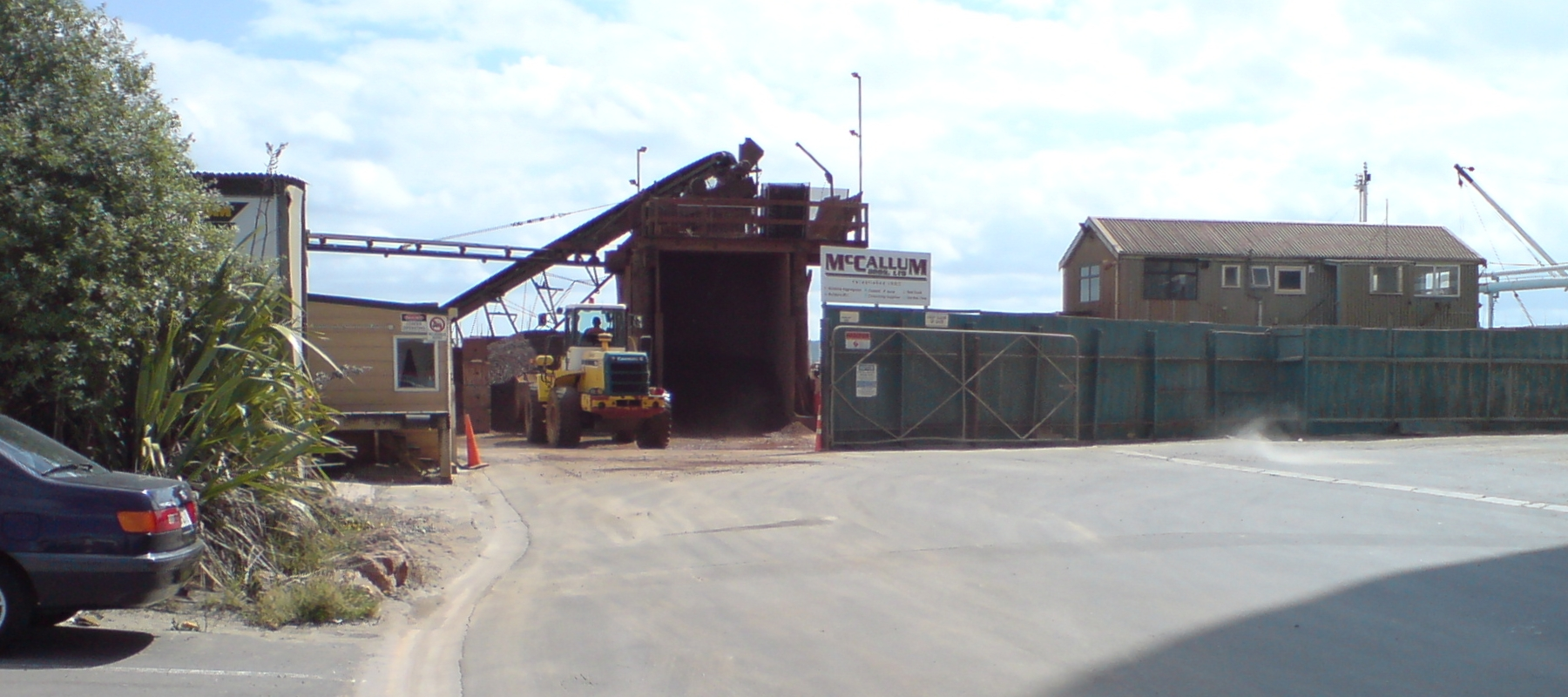
The former McCallum depot on the Western Reclamation on the Auckland waterfront, with a loader moving sand

McCallum Brothers is an Auckland, New Zealand-based sand and construction aggregate supplier. Its main products are sand and jasper (of which it quarries up to 30,000 tonnes per year). The company mainly supplies building and roading companies in the North Island of New Zealand, and it also provides sand for beach replenishment. It was founded in 1904, and is still in family ownership to this day.

The company has recently (2007) won a case in the Environment Court which will allow it to continue extracting sand from the Mangawhai-Pākiri embayment, with the court agreeing that the removal was environmentally sustainable, mainly due to the argument that the removal would not exceed the natural buildup of new sand, a point that had been contested by various local opponents and the ARC. McCallum Brothers itself also notes that the use of its own fleet of ships to deliver their product to the mostly coastal-area delivery locations around the Auckland area helps reduce traffic issues and improve sustainability.

To reduce dependence on the Pākiri area, the company is currently intending to gain permission to remove sand from the Kaipara Harbour, from where the sand would be transported to the Port of Onehunga. The extraction area is however historically considered dangerous for ships due to the local weather and sea conditions, which have wrecked or grounded many ships over the years.
