= Westhaven Marina =

Marina in Auckland, New Zealand

Coordinates: 36.83742°S 174.746561°E

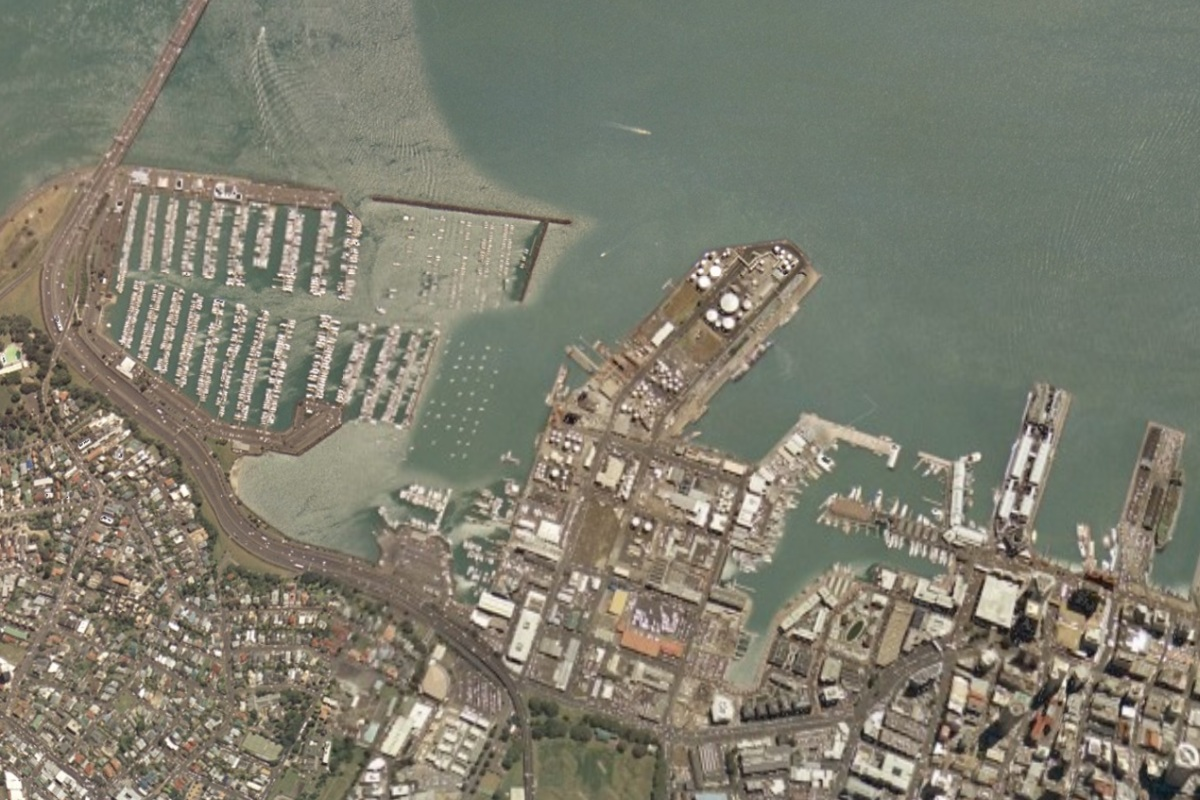
The marina at the west of the Auckland waterfront.

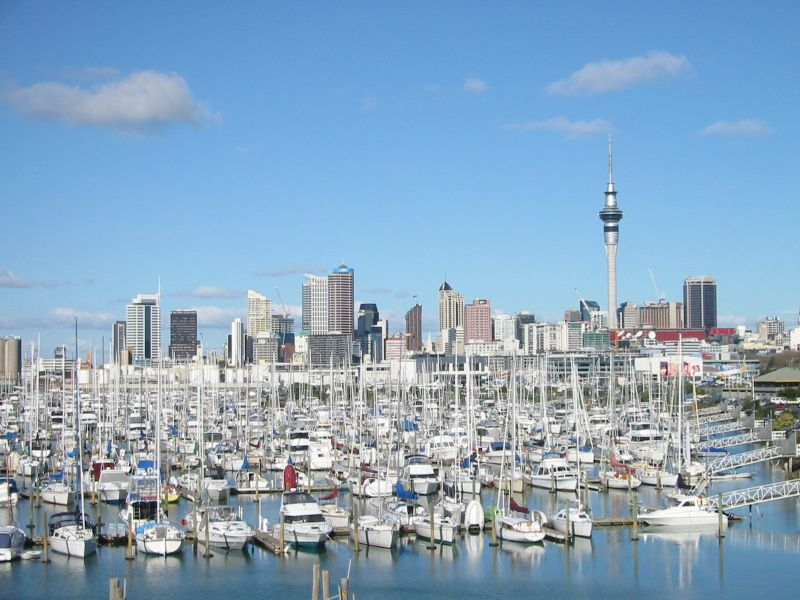
Westhaven Marina looking east, towards the Sky Tower.

Westhaven Marina in Auckland, New Zealand, is the largest yacht marina in the Southern Hemisphere. The marina has nearly two thousand berths and swing moorings, and tends to be continually booked. Auckland, known as 'City of Sails', is generally known for its maritime passions.

It is owned by Auckland Council, as successor to the Auckland City Council, which bought it from Ports of Auckland in 2004 for NZ$46 million.

In 2008, it received its second-time-running international 'Blue Flag award' for its water quality, environmental management and safety standards. It is one of 640 marinas worldwide (and the only marina in New Zealand) to have received the award.

== Construction ==
During the 1950s the foreshore of St. Mary's Bay disappeared under the approaches to the Auckland Harbour Bridge [opened 1959]. For over a century St Mary's Bay had been the location of several small commercial boatyards mixed in with the private moorings from houses set on the harbour cliffs above the bay. All these facilities were now to be cut off from the water.

The Auckland Harbour Board planned to fill in Westhaven completely, but a group of local residents including engineers and architects donated their services to create Westhaven Marina, now one of Auckland's greatest assets. If not for this initiative, the entire area might have become a continuation of the Western Reclamation industrial waterfront areas to the east.

== Plans ==
Council was proposing major works around the Marina for NZ$23 million up to 2011, though these were since deferred. This may include improved parks around the Auckland Harbour Bridge area, better footpaths and cycleways along Westhaven Drive and a Marine Village (with cafes and marine-related shops).

Panuku Development Auckland is the council-controlled organisation tasked with the revitalisation of the city's waterfront, and its plans for the area were last updated in 2015.

== See also ==
- Viaduct Basin, marine-themed entertainment and residential area further east
- Western Reclamation, industrial and marine use area directly to the east
