= The Cloud, Auckland =

Event venue in New Zealand

Coordinates: 36.84131°S 174.76786°E

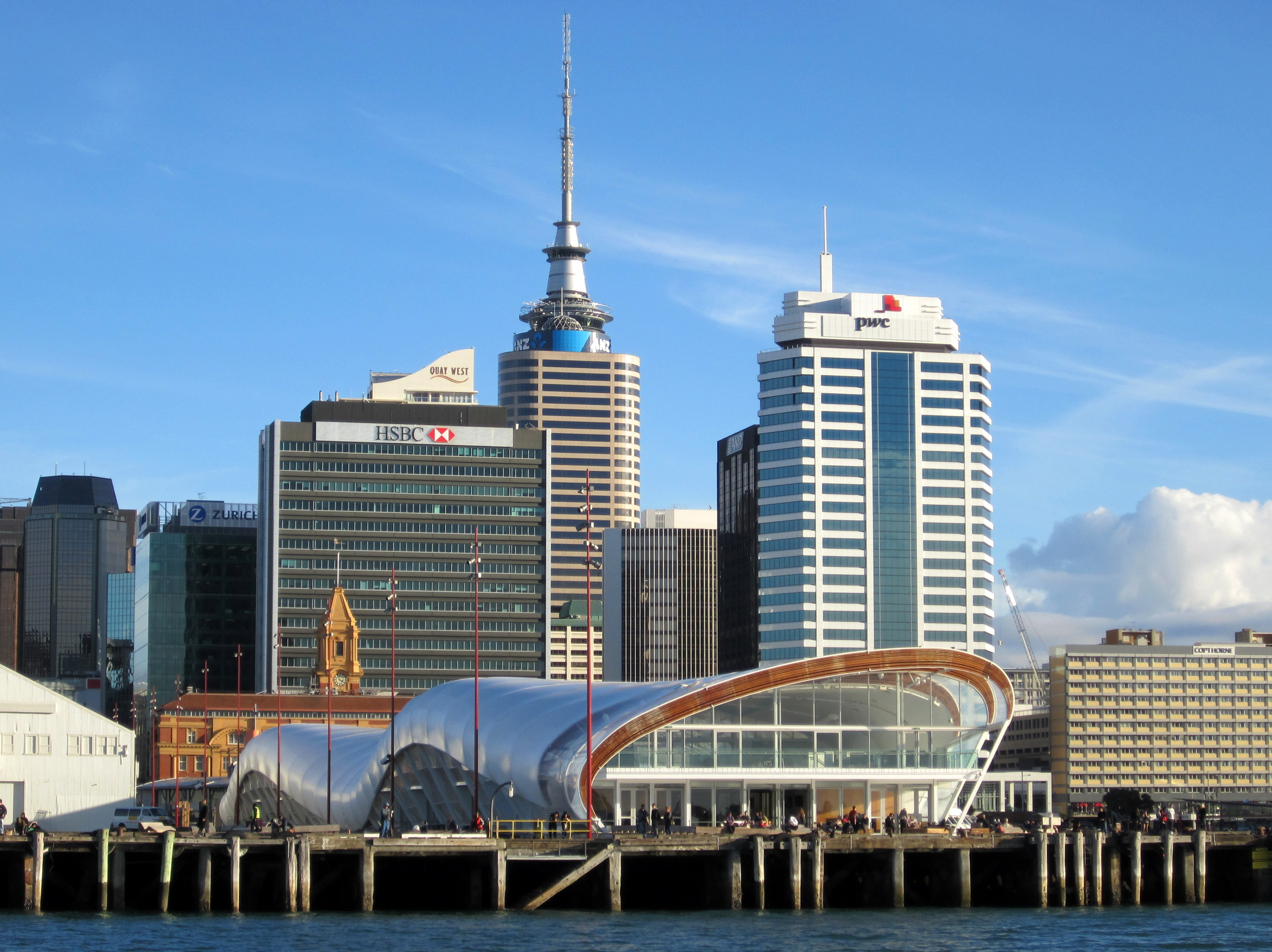
The Cloud viewed from the Devonport Ferry with Auckland CBD in the background

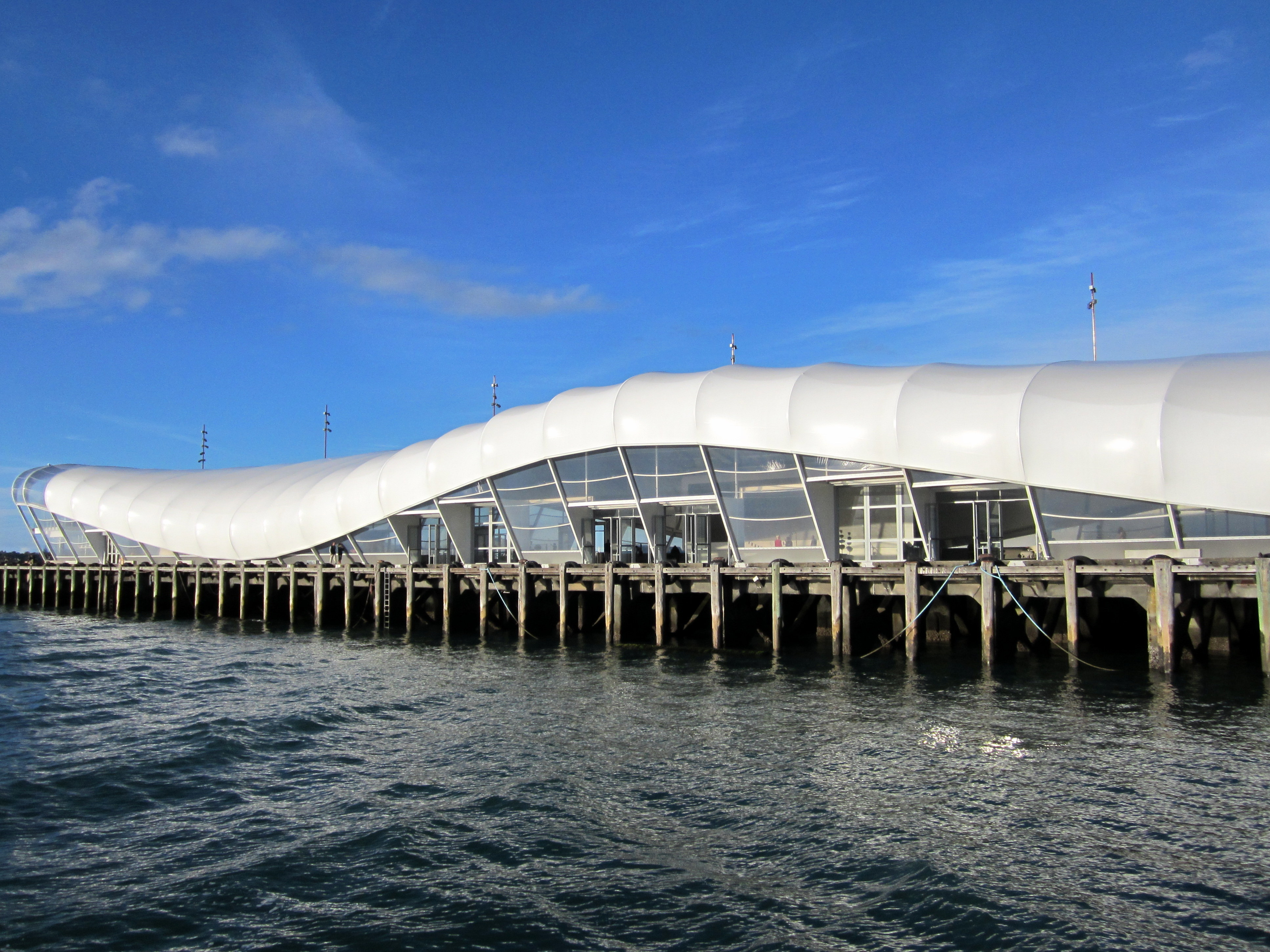
The Cloud viewed from the west

The Cloud is a multi-purpose event venue located on Queen's Wharf on the Auckland waterfront, in Auckland, New Zealand. Built as one of the centrepieces of the hospitality and 'party zone' facilities for the 2011 Rugby World Cup, it can host up to 6,000 people, and was originally expected to cost $NZ7.9 million. It was designed by Jasmax and built by Fletcher Construction.

The venue's location and construction was at times controversial, being nicknamed 'The Slug' by opponents, and for intending to displace two historical storage warehouses that were considered worth saving by heritage campaigners. In the compromise solution, rather than demolishing both sheds, one was saved and will be retained as a separate venue space directly next to The Cloud.

The work around The Cloud (construction $9.8 million) and Shed 10 (repairs for around $4 million) also included structural repairs to the wharf's piling, as well as significant installation of new services, including power and data cabling, water and wastewater lines, with most of the utilities fastened to the underside of the wharf.

An evaluation report by Nielsen for New Zealand Trade and Enterprise said, "showcases at the Cloud on Queens Wharf changed international visitors' impressions of the country, convincing them that New Zealand could be innovative."

As of late 2012, the consensus is that the building will remain on the wharf at least for the medium term, used as an event venue.

== Rugby World Cups ==
Auckland Regional Council has held this multifunction building as a party central for many events including the Rugby World Cup. In 2015, Auckland mayor Len Brown decided to show the final between New Zealand and Australia at the complex, as they decided that there are many cafes, restaurants and bars there for use of the public, as well as watching from the comfort of your own television.
