= Wynyard Crossing =

Bridge in Auckland, New Zealand

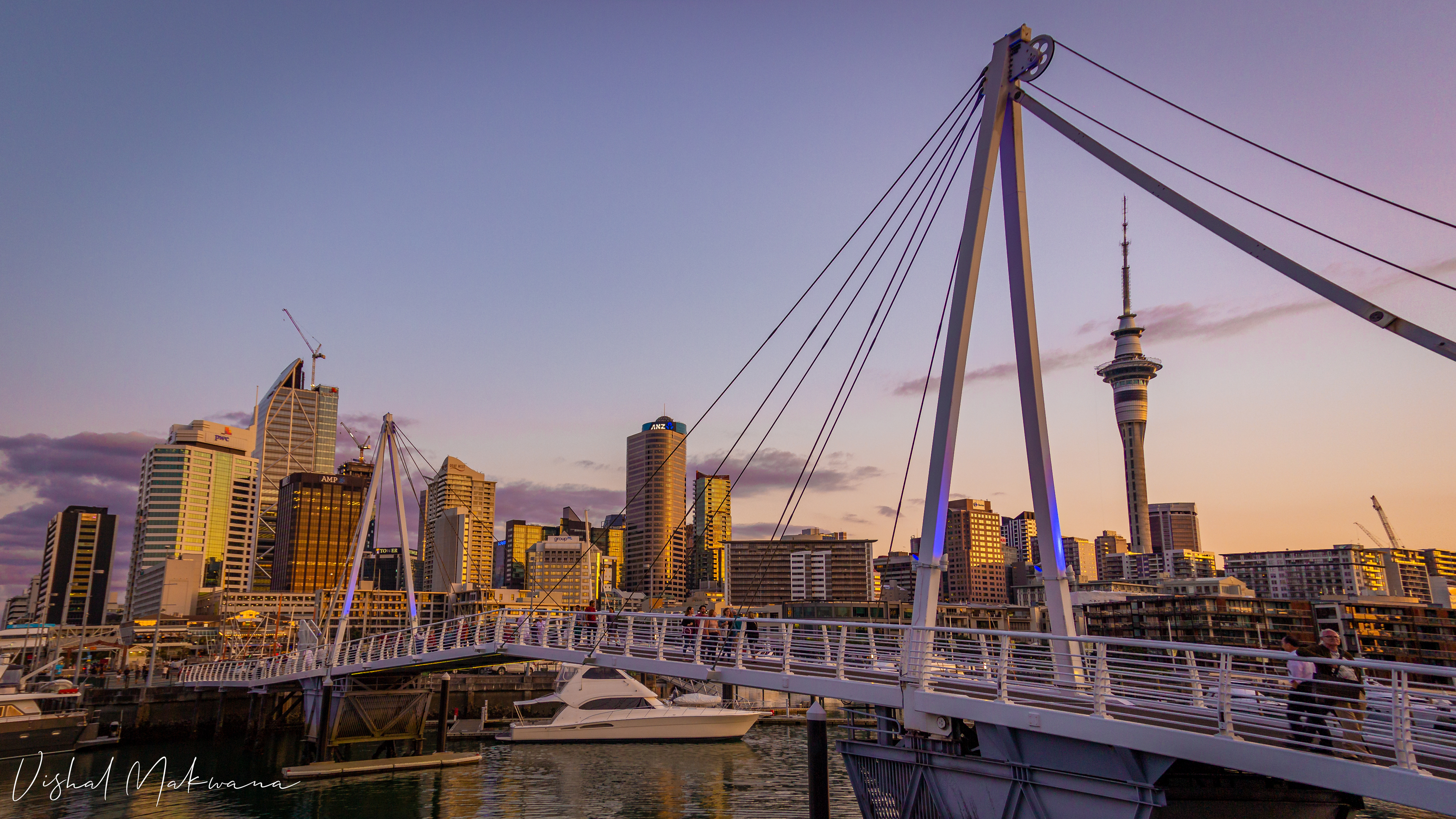
- The bridge in January 2020.
- Coordinates: 36°50′S 174°46′E
- Other name: Te Wero Bridge

Characteristics
- Total length: 100 metres (330 ft)

Location
- Interactive map of Wynyard Crossing

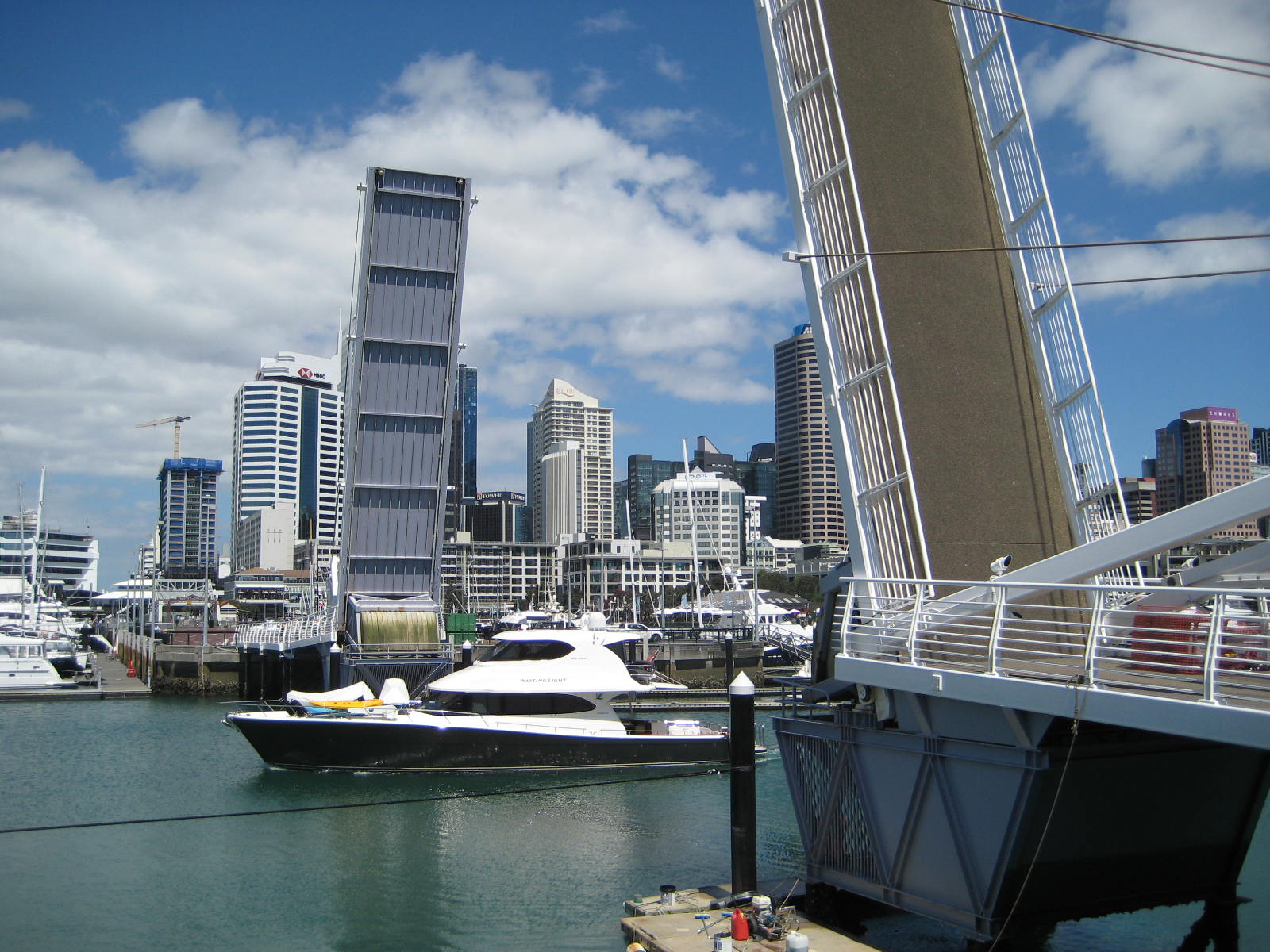
Bridge spans raised for a boat to exit the Viaduct Basin, 2021

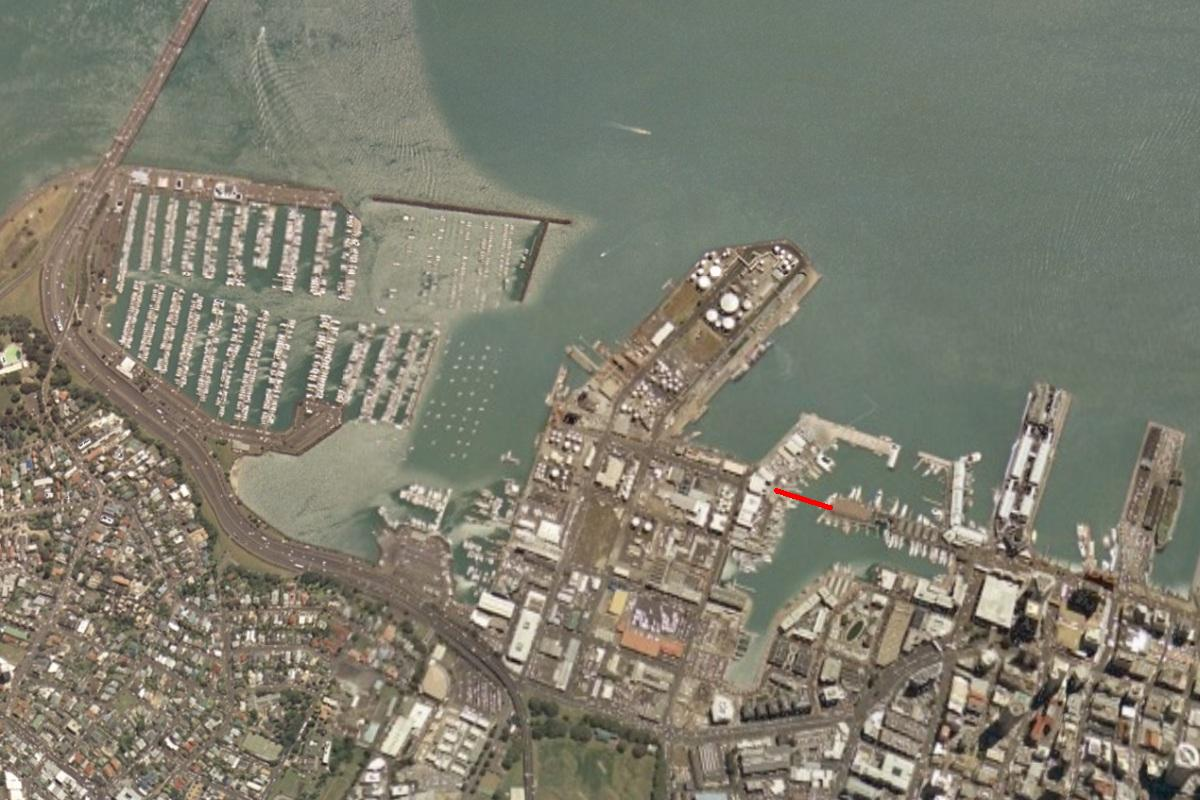
Satellite picture with the Wynyard Crossing location in red

Wynyard Crossing (also known as Te Wero Bridge) is a modern double bascule pedestrian and cyclists' bridge built in 2011 in Auckland, New Zealand. It connects the redeveloped Wynyard Quarter with Te Wero Island and the existing Viaduct Harbour entertainment district, and thereby, with the wider Auckland waterfront.

The 100-metre-long (330 ft) bridge is able to lift to allow watercraft passage into the Viaduct Harbour area, with a 36-metre-wide (118 ft) channel created by lifting two 22 m movable sections. At high tide, the closed bridge has a 3 m clearance and smaller boats do not require the spans to be raised. Opening and closing the bridge, which takes 90 and 60 seconds respectively, is controlled by an on-site operator contactable by boats via radio.

The bridge was proposed after high costs, estimated at $50 million, combined with financing issues during the Great Recession, prevented a more sizable structure (capable of carrying buses and trams) from being built in time for the Rugby World Cup 2011. Instead, a less expensive walking and cycling bridge was constructed from prefabricated sections – though the foundations are strong enough to later bear a more substantial bridge capable of carrying public transport vehicles. The planned cost of the bridge was $3.5 million, and piling works started in January 2011. In April 2011, the first of the two 29-ton spans of the lifting bridge was installed. The bridge opened for the public in early August 2011. It is closed to cyclists and pedestrians when not supervised, as during COVID lockdowns.

The design for the larger bridge, chosen in 2008 in an international competition, would have been a lightweight aluminium, counterbalanced, cable-supported, twin-leaf, bascule structure, with a 60 m (200 ft) high mast. Planned construction dates of 2016 and 2020, have not eventuated, despite the temporary bridge having high energy costs and needing frequent and costly repairs. Funding for a replacement will be sought in the 2025 Long Term Plan.
