= Princes Wharf, Auckland =

Wharf in Auckland, New Zealand

Coordinates: 36.840752°S 174.765015°E

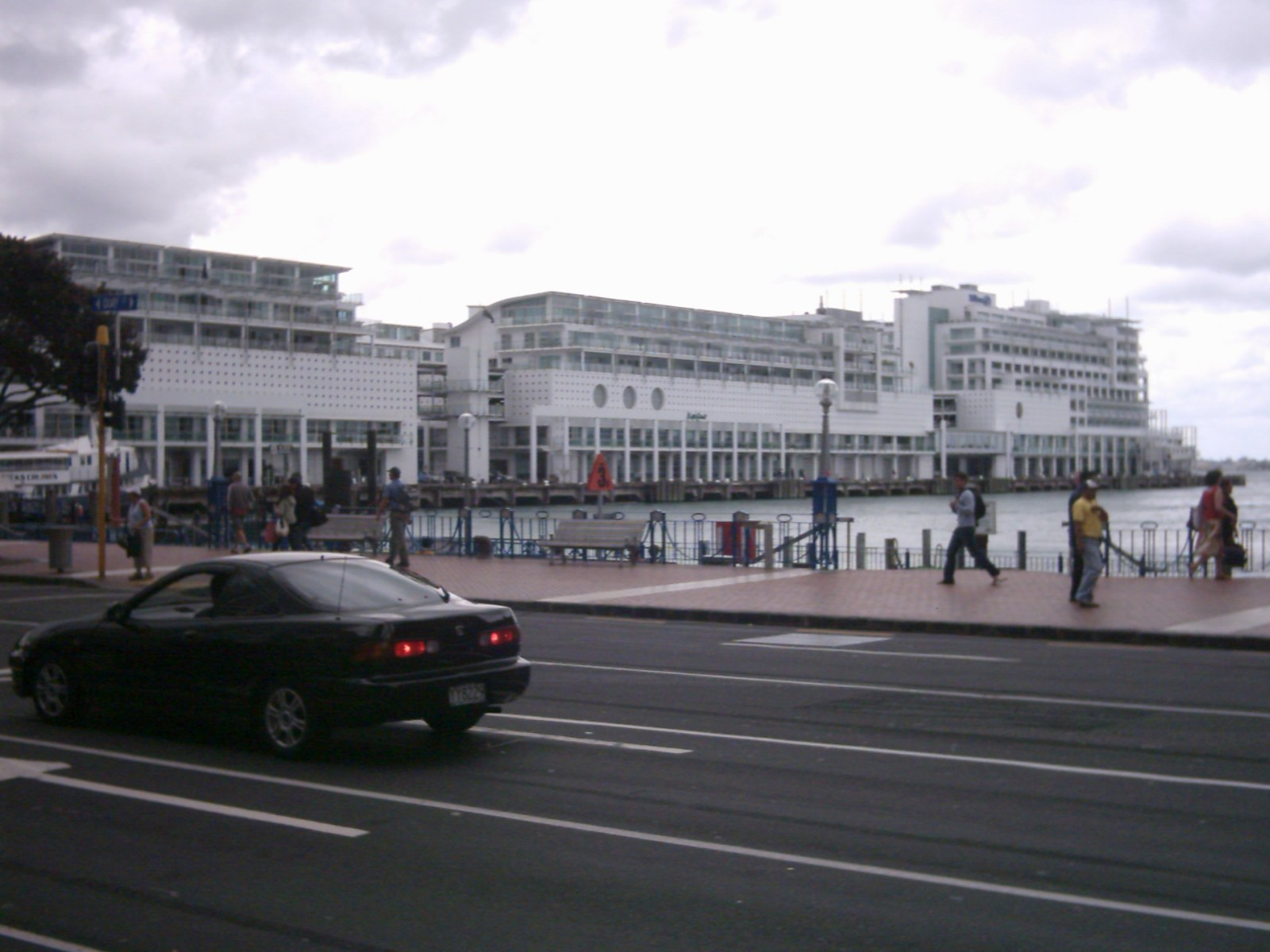
Princes Wharf as seen from Quay Street.

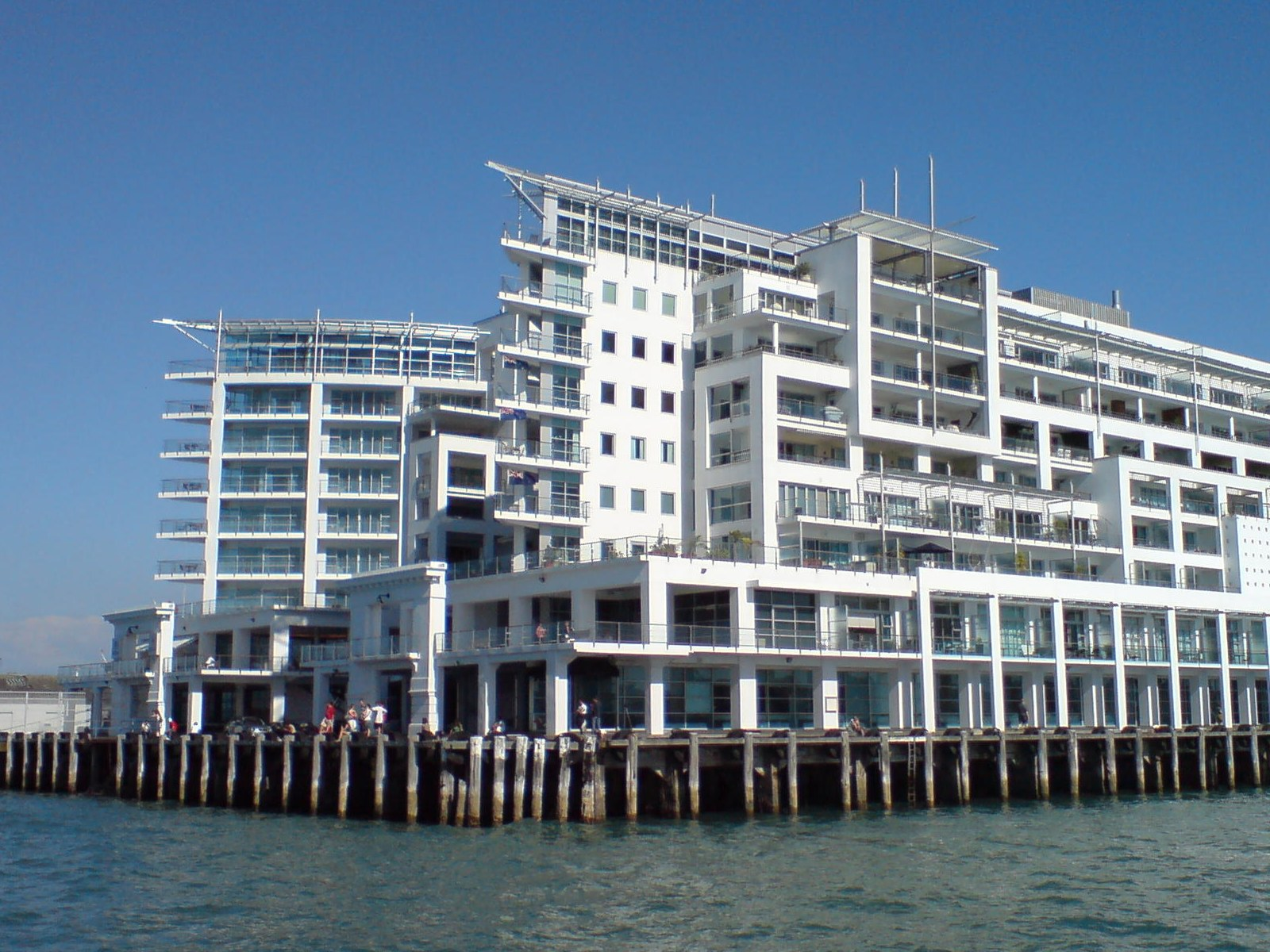
The two 'ship's prows' of the wharf as seen from Waitematā Harbour.

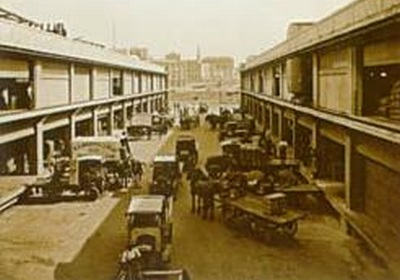
Loading at the old Princes Wharf in 1924.

Princes Wharf is a former commercial wharf on the Auckland waterfront, in Auckland, New Zealand, which has been redeveloped into a multi-story high-class mixed-use development and cruise ship terminal.

While generally considered a success in redevelopment, as is the close by Viaduct Basin, some critics have called its architecture 'urbanely sterile', while others have remarked on the restrictions private owners have placed on public access rights. Also criticised was that many of the public facilities (like art galleries or markets) that were envisaged in the original plan change from a wharf to a new use did not materialise, and in the view of some, have instead seen the wharf become dominated by uses like car parking.

== History ==
=== Working wharf ===
Plans for a new wharf between Hobson Wharf and the ferry terminal were made in 1920 by the Auckland Harbour Board, with construction commencing in 1921. The two-storey concrete structure was unique at the time in Auckland, as all previously constructed wharves utilised a single-storey shed design.

Princes Wharf was formally opened on 12 May 1929 by Earl Jellicoe. HMS Hood, the then-largest battlecruiser of the Royal Navy, berthed at the wharf for the commissioning, showing the strategic importance the British Empire attributed to the naval facilities of its colonies. During World War II, the wharf was placed under the control of the United States Armed Forces, and used to provide provisions to the Pacific Theatre of war.

After World War II, the wharf, and Auckland itself, gained in importance both as starting point and destination for an increasing number of ocean liners (especially in the early post-war years when long-distance air travel was not as established yet), and later on, cruise ships including the Rangitane and Ruahine. In 1960, passenger services were moved from the neighbouring Queens Wharf to Princes Wharf, and in 1961 a dedicated passenger terminal was built on the wharf.

=== Redevelopment ===
In the early 1990s, plans were introduced to redevelop the wharf and add new functions to a site that had become under-used in some respects. With the new buildings designed to be reminiscent of a ship, the redevelopment of the wharf started in 1998.

The wharf now contains the renovated Overseas Passenger Terminal (berthing of cruise ships) of Ports of Auckland, a Hilton hotel, various restaurants as well as apartments, office space and a multi-story parking building. Princes Wharf also contains the largest apartment of New Zealand, a luxury residence built for one of the wharf's developers with 1,061 m^{2} of internal floor space and decks of 416 m^{2} (4,480 sq ft) of deck space. However, a number of the hotel apartments - like many buildings constructed in the 1990s in New Zealand, are having weathertightness issues, and as of 2010, are undergoing substantial maintenance.

The development also contains first-floor viewing decks at the 'prow end' of the development, which are public space like other parts of the wharf, but have long been a matter of legal contention. The wharf developers and the Hilton hotel have repeatedly, and against legal orders, limited public access to this area (for example to use it for private functions), while officially claiming a need to act against vandalism and use by drug dealers. In the discussion about opening up more of the waterfront, the wharf has thus been cited as a negative example, touted by developers as providing more public access to the harbour, but now being all but privatised, as well as inadequate for the increasing demands of the cruise ship industry.
