= Stadium New Zealand =

Conceptual rugby stadium

Concept plan for the proposed Stadium New Zealand for the 2011 RWC, showing the proposed location to the west of the port area, northeast of the Britomart Transport Centre.

Stadium New Zealand, often called the Waterfront Stadium, was the provisional name for a national stadium proposed for the Auckland waterfront to host the 2011 Rugby World Cup. The stadium never advanced beyond a concept design.

The possible choice of the location for the stadium was widely contested in politics and public opinion. The potential effects on the amenity of the waterfront and port operations, the high costs of construction as well as criticism of political interference in the decision-making process led to conflicting decisions by local bodies and abandonment of the proposal in late November 2006.

== Background ==
=== Stadium site ===
The New Zealand Government commissioned research on an alternative stadium to Eden Park for hosting the 2011 Rugby World Cup. The proposal was to build a new stadium seating 60,000 on the Auckland waterfront, instead of at the previously mooted site, Eden Park, which is about 3.5 kilometres away from Auckland CBD. The preferred waterfront site was over Marsden wharf. However, Ports of Auckland, who use the land as a shipping container terminal, expressed concern that construction would not be finished in time for the 2011 Rugby World Cup, and that the new site would remove land important for the continuing function of the country's largest commercial port.

=== Alternative sites ===
Alternative sites such as Carlaw Park, North Harbour Stadium and Mt Smart Stadium fell out of favour with the Government, leading to questions concerning the political motivations for such strong support for the waterfront stadium.

The Government claimed Carlaw Park was not a suitable location as several hundred trees would need to be felled, there would be a requirement for three hectares of land from the Auckland Domain and because parts of the proposed site are privately owned with existing plans. The Government also claimed there was inadequate space to accommodate people leaving the stadium. North Harbour Stadium was also initially dismissed for transport reasons.

A further alternative proposal, for a stadium over the eastern part of the Mangere Inlet, failed to gain much publicity.

=== Estimated cost ===
The stadium was estimated to cost NZ$497 million by the Government, although it was stated that this figure could have risen, with stadium projects historically having substantial overruns (later quoted in the New Zealand Herald as up to 30% or more). The cost was a source of controversy, with various figures having been quoted by different sources. The Government and construction industries sources noted that all costings of large projects are unreliable, and that redevelopment of Eden Park also faces uncertainties. The Government proposed that to assist funding, levies on hotels, motels and backpacker lodges might be introduced, along with promotions run by the New Zealand Lotteries Commission.

== Decision process ==
=== Differing votes ===
On 10 November 2006, the New Zealand Government announced its preference for a waterfront stadium to be built over Marsden and Captain Cook wharves. The Government asked the Auckland City Council and the Auckland Regional Council to determine which proposal they each preferred, with only the waterfront stadium or a redeveloped Eden Park as options. A two-week consultation of Auckland residents was arranged, and a deadline of 24 November 2006 was set for the Auckland City Council and the Auckland Regional Council to give their respective preference. The deadline was widely criticised as giving insufficient time for consultation, though some commentators defended it as being necessary to move along the process.

On 22 November 2006, an injunction was proposed to the High Court in Auckland by five residents of Auckland City against the Waterfront Stadium, stating that enough time was not given for the decision to be made between the Eden Park Stadium and the new Waterfront Stadium. The injunction was rejected an hour before the Auckland City Council met to decide its preference for a venue. The High Court ruled that there would be adequate future opportunities to fight any venue decision.

- In a 5-hour meeting on the night of 23 November, the Auckland City Council gave support to the waterfront proposal by a 13–7 vote. However they qualified their assent by wanting the stadium to be "substantially east" of the Marsden Wharf/Captain Cook location preferred by the government, cutting more deeply into port lands, but also keeping views from Britomart unobstructed.
- On 24 November, the Auckland Regional Council unanimously voted against supporting the construction of the stadium at the waterfront (mainly due to its effects on port operations), opting instead to lend their support to an upgrade of Auckland's current rugby venue, Eden Park.

=== Outcome ===
On 27 November, the New Zealand Government, taking into consideration the votes of the Auckland City Council and the Auckland Regional Council and numerous public submissions, decided to drop the Stadium New Zealand proposal in favour of the redevelopment of Eden Park. Cabinet asked that more work be done on the design, funding and governance of Eden Park and that North Harbour Stadium be considered as a reserve option.

== See also ==
- 2011 Rugby World Cup
- Carlaw Park
- Eden Park
- North Harbour Stadium
- Ports of Auckland
