= Eke Panuku Development Auckland =

Group responsible for managing and developing property owned by the Auckland Council

- Type: Council-controlled organisation
- Predecessor: Waterfront Auckland and Auckland Council Property
- Founded: 1 September 2015; 11 years ago
- Defunct: July 1, 2025
- Fate: Functions transferred to new divisions within Auckland Council.
- Successor: Auckland Council
- Headquarters: Auckland CBD, New Zealand
- Area served: Auckland Region
- Key people: Paul Majurey; Board Chair; David Rankin; Chief Executive
- Services: Urban regeneration, town centre planning, urban spaces design, and property management
- Total assets: NZ$2.3 billion Non-core Auckland Council assets
- Owner: Auckland Council
- Number of employees: 200+ (as of 2022)
- Website: www.ekepanuku.co.nz

Eke Panuku Development Auckland (Eke Panuku) was one of four council-controlled organisations (CCOs) of Auckland Council in Auckland, New Zealand. Eke Panuku managed a NZD$2.3bn property portfolio of non-core Auckland Council assets. Eke Panuku was disestablished on 1 July 2025, with its functions transferred to Auckland Council.

Eke Panuku bought, managed and sold property on behalf of Auckland Council and its CCOs. It did not develop the sites directly, but acted as the "master developer" to "unlock development potential for others", leveraging Auckland Council landholdings for urban regeneration and social outcomes. It had portfolios that ranged from small housing developments to long-term regeneration such as the Wynyard Quarter on Auckland's waterfront, and to redevelopment of town centres and malls.

== History ==
Eke Panuku was established on 1 September 2015 with a board of nine members plus the Chief Executive. It was formed from a merger between Waterfront Auckland and Auckland Council Property (ACPL). The merged entity was briefly referred to as Development Auckland prior to its rebranding as Panuku. It was later renamed to Eke Panuku.

Prior to merging, Waterfront Auckland served "custodians of the waterfront on behalf of Auckland ratepayers". The agency was responsible for leading the revitalisation of Auckland's inner waterfront. Waterfront Auckland oversaw first stage of the Wynyard Quarter development and the reopening of Queens Wharf as a public space. It was responsible for attracting multinational hospitality company Hyatt back to New Zealand with the $400 million five-star Park Hyatt Auckland being built on the waterfront. Waterfront Auckland was chaired by Sir Bob Harvey, former mayor of Waitakere City.

ACPL undertook all property acquisitions and disposals for Auckland Council and Auckland Transport, managing $900 million in assets in 2015. It was tasked with ensuring appropriate financial return on council-owned commercial or non-service property. The agency played a key role in enabling Auckland Council's place-shaping and housing development objectives with a focus on affordable housing and town centre regeneration. One example is ACPL partnering with Todd Property Ltd to develop the Ormiston Town Centre, a major greenfield site for Auckland at Flat Bush. ACPL was chaired by Sir John Wells, former banker and chair of the Auckland City Council Property Enterprise Board.

All functions of Eke Panuku were transferred to Auckland Council on 1 July 2025, with the establishment of a new Auckland Urban Development Office and Property Department within Auckland Council.

== Organisation ==
Eke Panuku had two core functions being their priority development locations and portfolio management.

The organisation was led by a board of directors comprising seven members appointed by Auckland Council. The disestablishment board chair was Auckland-based Iwi leader and environmental and treaty lawyer - Paul Majurey.

Eke Panuku operationally was led by an executive leadership team headed by the Chief Executive. David Rankin was the disestablishment Chief Executive, leading the organisation since 2019. Rankin was Chief Executive of Auckland Council Property at the time of merging with Waterfront Auckland. Rankin also was chief executive officer of Auckland City Council from 2005 until amalgamation to Auckland Council in 2010.

=== Chief executives ===
- David Rankin – November 2019 – July 1, 2025.
- Roger MacDonald – November 2016 – 1 November 2019
- John Dalzell – interim CEO from 1 September 2015, formerly head of Waterfront Auckland

== Portfolio ==
Eke Panuku owned numerous public assets in Auckland including:

- Westhaven Marina
- Silo Marina
- Viaduct Marina
- Wynyard Quarter

== Projects ==
Eke Panuku led urban regeneration within 'priority locations' across Auckland, these locations are granted status by Auckland Council. There are 13 priority locations across Auckland including:

- Avondale
- City Centre
- Henderson
- Manukau
- Maungawhau & Karangahape
- Northcote
- Old Papatoetoe
- Onehunga
- Ormiston
- Panmure
- Pukekohe
- Takapuna
- Wynyard Quarter

In December 2022, Mayor Wayne Brown tasked Eke Panuku to work on conceptual plans for staged development of Ports of Auckland land, citing Eke Panuku "did a very good job with Wynyard Quarter".

In June 2022, Eke Panuku and the New Zealand Superannuation Fund announced a commercial partnership to 'accelerate urban regeneration' in Auckland. The partnership will mean Eke Panuku can "move faster and go further in the critical work it is doing to rejuvenate town centres across Auckland" said then-Mayor Phil Goff in announcing the partnership.

Eke Panuku worked with the council's transport CCO Auckland Transport to re-house owners and tenants prior to the demolition of more than 60 properties in preparation for the construction of the Eastern Busway.

In December 2018, Eke Panuku was involved in construction of a new mall in Ormiston in south Auckland, in conjunction with Todd Property. Nearby, 700 homes are being built by the partnership.

== Thriving Town Centres ==
In 2022, Eke Panuku released the Thriving Town Centres guidance defining their 'core principles and critical success factors' for urban regeneration. The guidance describes the agency's approach to urban regeneration including climate action, low-carbon lifestyles, Māori outcomes and facilitating new homes with better transport choice and enabling economic opportunity.

== Controversy ==
In October 2016, Eke Panuku began limiting the amount of information it released about discussions behind its closed door board meetings. At that time, it was managing $1 billion worth of council-owned land and buildings.

In December 2018, Eke Panuku was involved in construction of a new mall in Ormiston in south Auckland, in conjunction with Todd Property. Nearby, 700 homes are being built by the partnership.

On 1 November 2019, it was announced that CEO Roger MacDonald had resigned after a period of leave. The reason for the leave has not been made public. Mayor of Auckland Phil Goff, who was re-elected in October 2019, had expressed dissatisfaction with MacDonald over an $80,000 increase in his salary, an executive bonus scheme introduced by him, and his acceptance of hospitality from a company which bought the council's former headquarters building through Eke Panuku.
