= Wynyard Quarter =

Suburb of Auckland, New Zealand

(Auckland Harbour Bridge)	(Waitematā Harbour)	(Waitematā Harbour)
Westhaven	Wynyard Quarter	Viaduct Harbour
Saint Marys Bay	Freemans Bay	Auckland City Centre

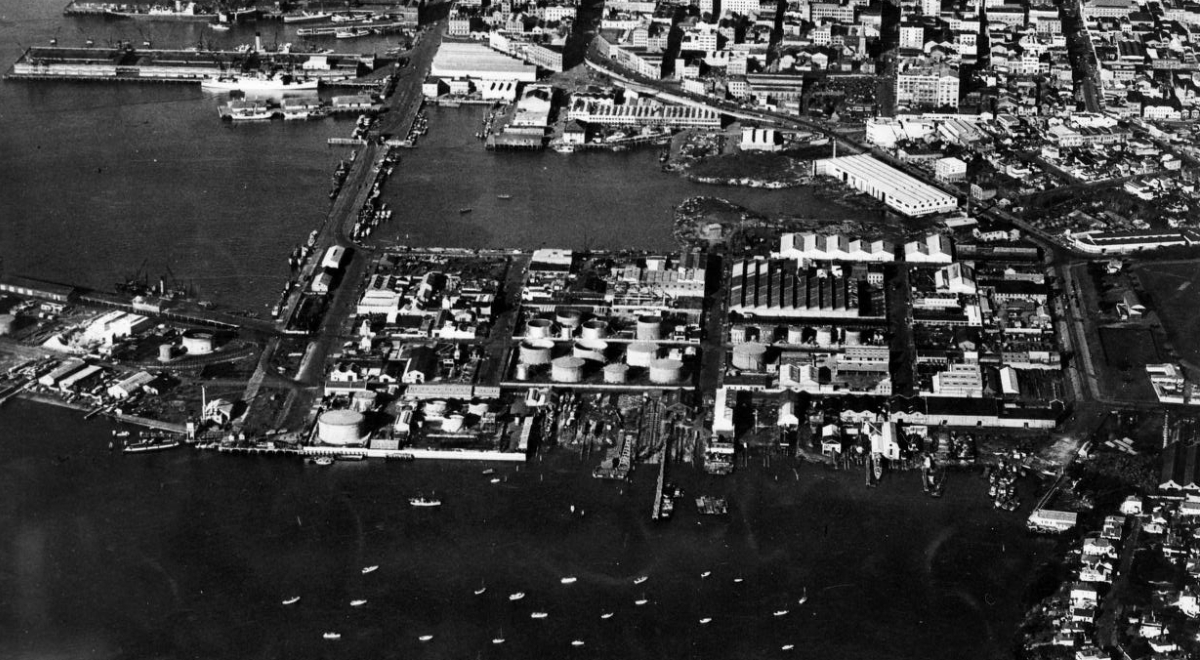
Seen eastwards from an airplane in the 1950s, when it was known as "Western Reclamation" or "Tank Farm".

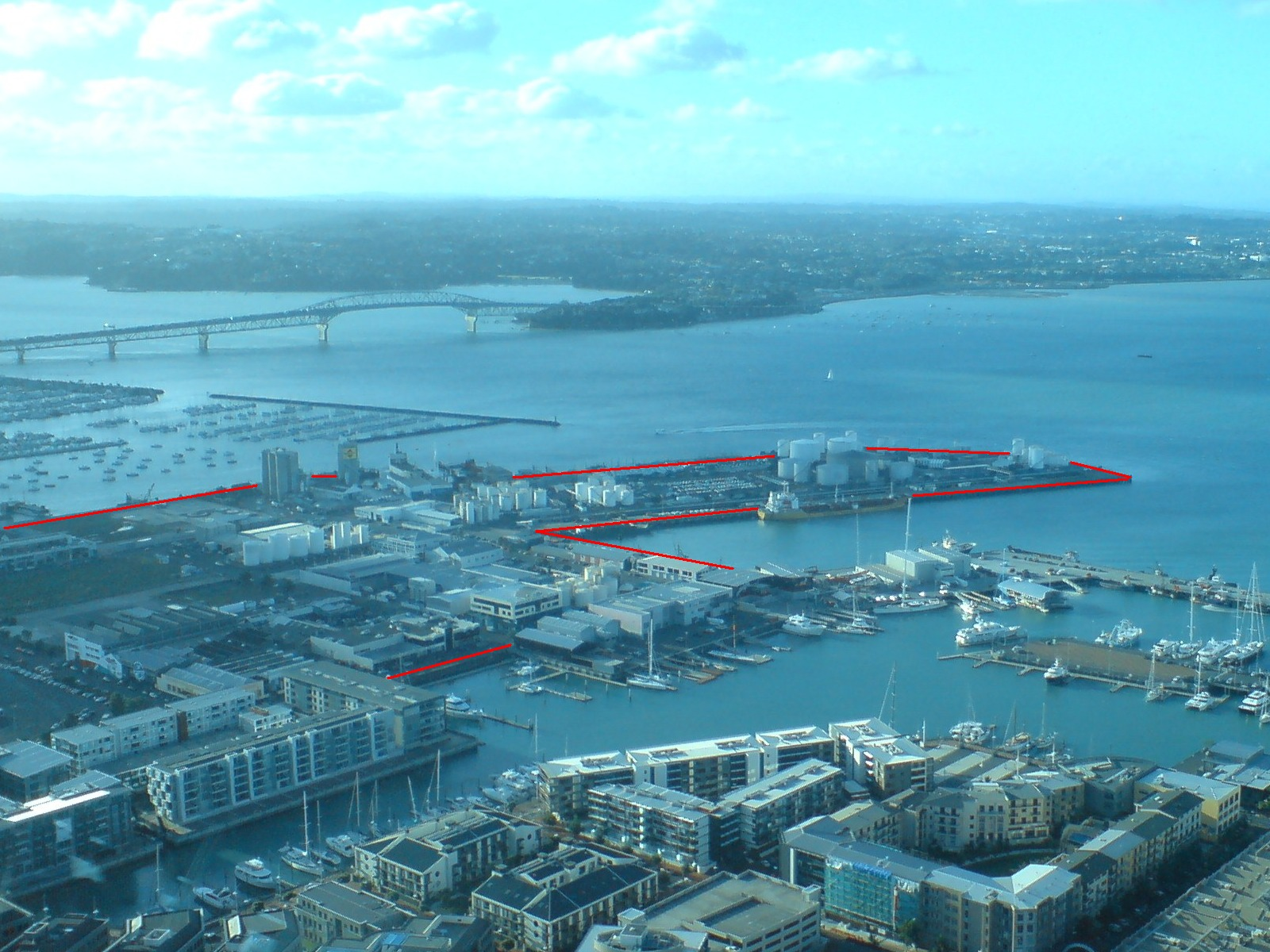
Looking towards Wynyard Quarter from Auckland Sky Tower, with approximate boundary drawn in red

The Wynyard Quarter (historically also known as the Western Reclamation, Wynyard Point, Wynyard Wharf or Tank Farm) is a reclaimed piece of land on the Waitematā Harbour at the western edge of the Auckland waterfront, New Zealand.

It is located to the north of Freemans Bay and to the west of the Viaduct Basin. As of 2012, a good part of the area is still covered by petrol and liquid chemical storage facilities of Ports of Auckland Ltd (POAL) and various other companies, that gave the area its now slowly disappearing "Tank Farm" moniker. However, major changes are underway, with the area intended to be redeveloped into a mixed-use residential-commercial area, with a major park to run along the northern headland and up to the point. As one of the first changes, the eastern section of the Quarter, as well as one of the main west-east roads running across it, were revitalised with new office and entertainment/restaurant areas, with several major projects finishing in time for the 2011 Rugby World Cup tournament.

== History ==
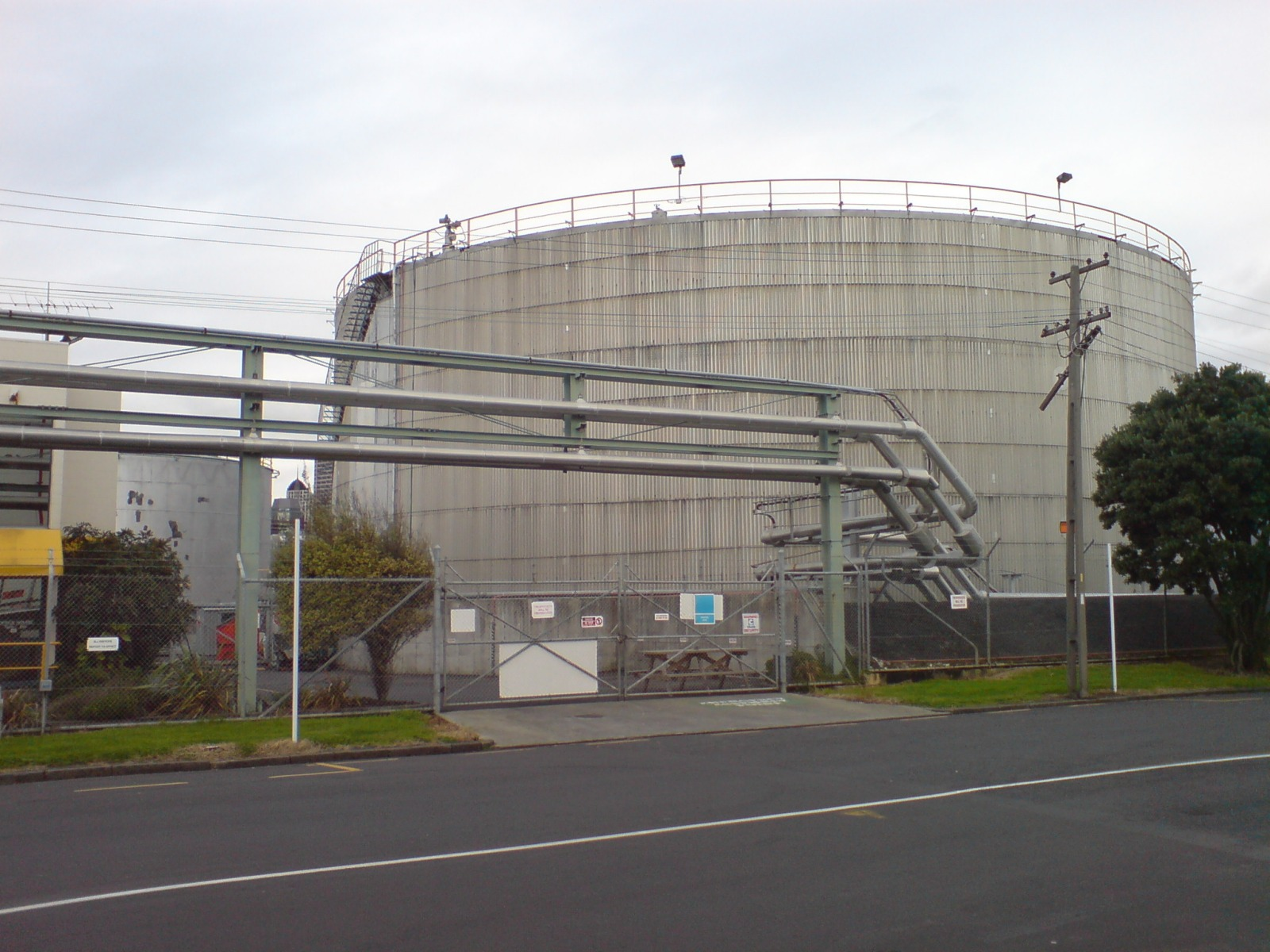
Bulk liquid storage remains one of the main uses in some areas.

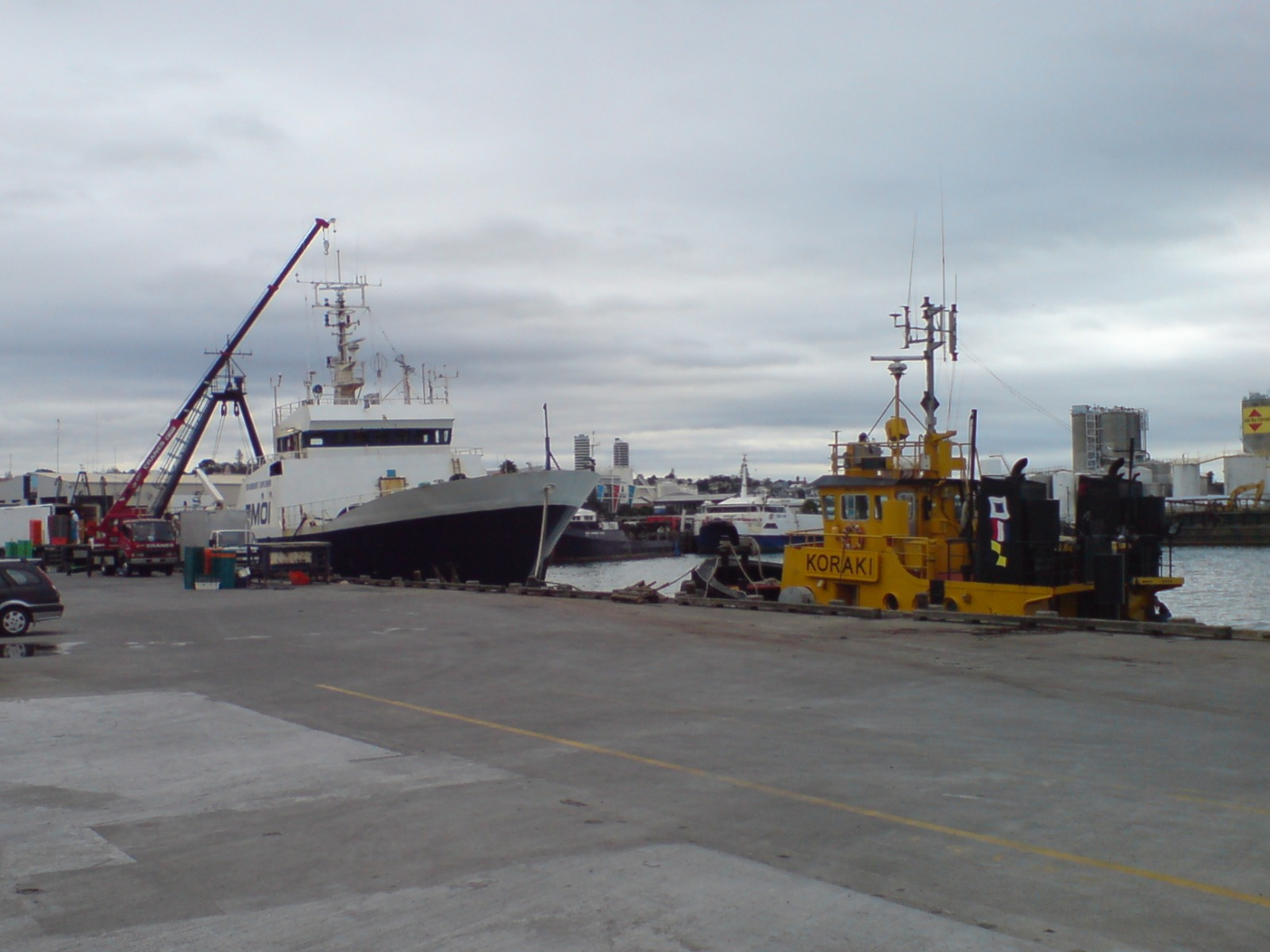
Marine industries such fishing and shipbuilding are to remain, mainly concentrated along the west of the new quarter.

=== Early use ===
The Western Reclamation was progressively constructed by the Auckland Harbour Board, of which Ports of Auckland is the successor. The last components of the reclamation (Wynyard Wharf) were being completed in 1930 and provided the growing harbour with additional berthage capacity and increased land for port activities. Initially used mainly by the timber trade, it gradually changed to the current bulk petro-chemical storage.

=== Current use ===
As of the late 2000s, the area was still used by the bulk liquid industry, with 500,000 tonnes of liquids and cement being transported via Wynyard Wharf each year. This provides NZ$1.2 billion of yearly turnover, and 4000 jobs in the Auckland economy. There are also more than 100 marine companies around the area, with a NZ$400 million yearly turnover, exporting items worth NZ$120 million per year. Three fishing fleets, Moana Pacific, Sanford and Simunovich, are based in the area.

SeaLink runs a car and passenger ferry service to Great Barrier Island from a terminal at the base of Wynyard Wharf. The company was seeking clarification of its future facilities in the area in 2007, as their lease was running out in 2010, and it was unlikely to invest a planned NZ$19 million in a new terminal or start using a new, faster ferry vessel before legal concerns were sorted out. An ARC planning committee noted that it supported the further provision of the ferry service in the area, though there had previously been concerns about the island freight shipping not fitting into the redevelopment vision of the area (see below). The Waterfront Plan completed 2012 does include the island ferry terminal, to be in the same general area as before.

Shipping fuel storage, once an important facility at the Tank Farm, and delivered to ships in port by the Tolema refueling barge, was taken over in the late 2000s by a marine fuel tanker, the Awanuia, owned by the Seafuels company. The vessel serves Ports of Auckland shipping by bringing in fuels from the Marsden Point refinery in Whangārei.

A sand mining company, McCallum Brothers, used part of the western water's edge to unload barges of dredged sand (for construction projects) but has moved out of the area which was subsequently transformed into a public park / event space (Silo Park).

== Redevelopment ==
=== Initial plans ===
Ports of Auckland still owned 18 ha (44 acres) of the 35 ha (86-acre) site in 2006 when it was decided that the land would be transferred to its parent company, Auckland Regional Holdings, owned by the Auckland Regional Council. As was noted on the Tank Farm website in 2006:

Changes in bulk liquid transportation, the advent of the pipeline from Marsden Point, and the progressive expiration of industrial leases in the reclamation means that Ports of Auckland's land is becoming a precinct in search of a new purpose.

Following similar declarations by Auckland City and the Auckland Regional Council, political and design processes were underway in the mid and late 2000s to define the future shape of the area, a change process that will take up to 20 years. One of the main public inputs at that time was a wish for increased waterfront access, as well as the desire for more parkland on the point. However, some of these wishes were muted from political sources, as the redevelopment of the area is to be paid by the development of residential areas, with the available land for this use shrinking with an increase of the proposed park space. Already mostly agreed on was a bridge connecting the new quarter to the Viaduct Basin.

Early plans intended to name the new area 'Kahurangi', Māori for 'blue/precious jewel'. This has now been replaced with 'Wynyard Quarter', though it is still generally referred to as Tank Farm, including when talking about the whole Western Reclamation. Others have suggested the label 'Tech-Farm', referencing a 2004 call to showcase on the waterfront New Zealand's best sustainable design and technology, as well as anticipating the government's and council's 2012 initiative to establish an 'innovation precinct' within the Wynyard Quarter.

=== Project scope ===
First stage

In June 2007, more detailed concept plans were published after a year of negotiation between stakeholders. In the first stage of the redevelopment, the eastern section of the Western Reclamation, along Jellicoe Street, was to be turned into an entertainment strip, to complement similar areas on the eastern side of the Viaduct Basin, and to be completed in time for the 2011 Rugby World Cup. This area was to be linked to the Auckland CBD via a new 'Te Wero' bridge, to be constructed as a lift- or swing bridge after an international design competition, and expected to cost around NZ$35 million.

As part of the area renewal, the 'Wind Tree' sculpture that was located in Queen Elizabeth II Square outside of Britomart from 1971 until 2002 was installed in the new Jellicoe Square.

The August 2011 opening of the Wynyard Quarter to the general public, with the main features being the new Jellicoe Street and North Wharf areas, as well as the open spaces around 'Silo Park' (designed by Taylor Cullity Lethlean and Wraight and Associates) and the Viaduct Events Centre, were met with great public interest, and critical acclaim for the synthesis between open space and formerly industrial use.

The July 2007 concept plan for the area.

Later stages

In a next stage, a large 'point park' of 4.25 ha (10.5 acres) is to be developed on Wynyard Point, with another park strip along the east side of Wynyard Wharf. This larger design followed wide public complaints in 2006 about the new development being dominated by apartments. The layout of the park is also to be decided via an international design competition, and would leave space for a so far unidentified landmark public building. The park would include about 2.4 km (1.5 mi) of waterfront access, and would be linked with Victoria Park via a 40 m wide (130 ft) tree-lined boulevard and a NZ$5 million pedestrian bridge. This work would likely take place between 2014 and 2017, after commercial leases in the area run out. Other areas in the Western Reclamation will remain set aside for marine industry, with the main bulk of land being developed as apartments, with some associated smaller-scale retail and entertainment areas.

One matter of contention, as became visible during previous consultation, is the future building height of the residential areas. After 10–16-storey buildings proposed in 2006 met strong opposition, the July 2007 design envisages only a small number of 14-storey towers, with the main apartment strips along the eastern side of Wynyard Wharf being no higher than seven storeys at the road, stepping down to three storeys at the water's edge.

The new Western Reclamation zone is to be dominated by public transport, with the targeted transport mix being 70% public transport / walking / cycling and 30% motor vehicle, a reversal of the typical modal share in Auckland City. Ferries are also mooted as possible connections.

Cruise ship terminal

With new plans to open up the Auckland waterfront for more public access, the lack of sufficient cruise ship berthing space has entered the public discussion early 2008. This led to considerations that a new terminal could be built on the Western Reclamation. A major negative point for this usage would however be the short-term (from 2010 on) need for more cruise ship space, while the tank farm is unlikely to be redeveloped less than a decade in the future.

=== Funding ===
The public infrastructure costs of redeveloping the Western Reclamation were first estimated at around NZ$400 million in 2006, of which between 5 per cent and 10 per cent are expected to be spent on cleanup of soil contamination due to petrochemicals. In 2007, this was updated to NZ$504 million (with the whole project, including the private investment, expected to cost more than NZ$2 billion). Most of the public infrastructure costs, NZ$349 million, are expected to be carried by development contributions, with NZ$112 million from Auckland Regional Holdings (Auckland Regional Council) and NZ$43 million from Auckland City Council.

=== Construction ===
In 2010, the first stages of work began in the Wynyard Quarter, among them the construction of a new-look, 'pedestrian-oriented boulevard' Jellicoe Street, which is to be a new entertainment area, linked to the Viaduct Harbour by a walking/cycling bridge (Wynyard Crossing). Also underway is the construction of a new length of tram track (see further section below). All the projects are to be completed in time for the Rugby World Cup 2011, when the area is to be part of an extended Viaduct Basin visitor zone on the waterfront.

== Demographics ==
Wynyard Quarter covers 0.47 km^{2} (0.18 sq mi). It is part of the statistical area of Wynyard-Viaduct, which also covers the Viaduct Harbour.

Historical population
Year	Pop.	±% p.a.
2006	30	—
2013	126	+22.75%
2018	165	+5.54%
2023	486	+24.12%
The 2006 population is for a smaller area of 0.42 km^{2}. Source:

Wynyard Quarter had a population of 486 in the 2023 New Zealand census, an increase of 321 people (194.5%) since the 2018 census, and an increase of 360 people (285.7%) since the 2013 census. There were 243 males and 246 females in 327 dwellings. 7.4% of people identified as LGBTIQ+. The median age was 51.3 years (compared with 38.1 years nationally). There were 12 people (2.5%) aged under 15 years, 84 (17.3%) aged 15 to 29, 279 (57.4%) aged 30 to 64, and 111 (22.8%) aged 65 or older.

People could identify as more than one ethnicity. The results were 79.0% European (Pākehā); 6.2% Māori; 2.5% Pasifika; 17.9% Asian; 3.7% Middle Eastern, Latin American and African New Zealanders (MELAA); and 1.2% other, which includes people giving their ethnicity as "New Zealander". English was spoken by 98.8%, Māori language by 1.9%, and other languages by 28.4%. The percentage of people born overseas was 41.4, compared with 28.8% nationally.

Religious affiliations were 24.7% Christian, 1.9% Hindu, 0.6% Islam, 3.7% Buddhist, 0.6% Jewish, and 0.6% other religions. People who answered that they had no religion were 65.4%, and 3.7% of people did not answer the census question.

Of those at least 15 years old, 276 (58.2%) people had a bachelor's or higher degree, 129 (27.2%) had a post-high school certificate or diploma, and 69 (14.6%) people exclusively held high school qualifications. The median income was $84,800, compared with $41,500 nationally. 204 people (43.0%) earned over $100,000 compared to 12.1% nationally. The employment status of those at least 15 was that 273 (57.6%) people were employed full-time, 54 (11.4%) were part-time, and 9 (1.9%) were unemployed.

== Transport ==
=== Tram circuit ===
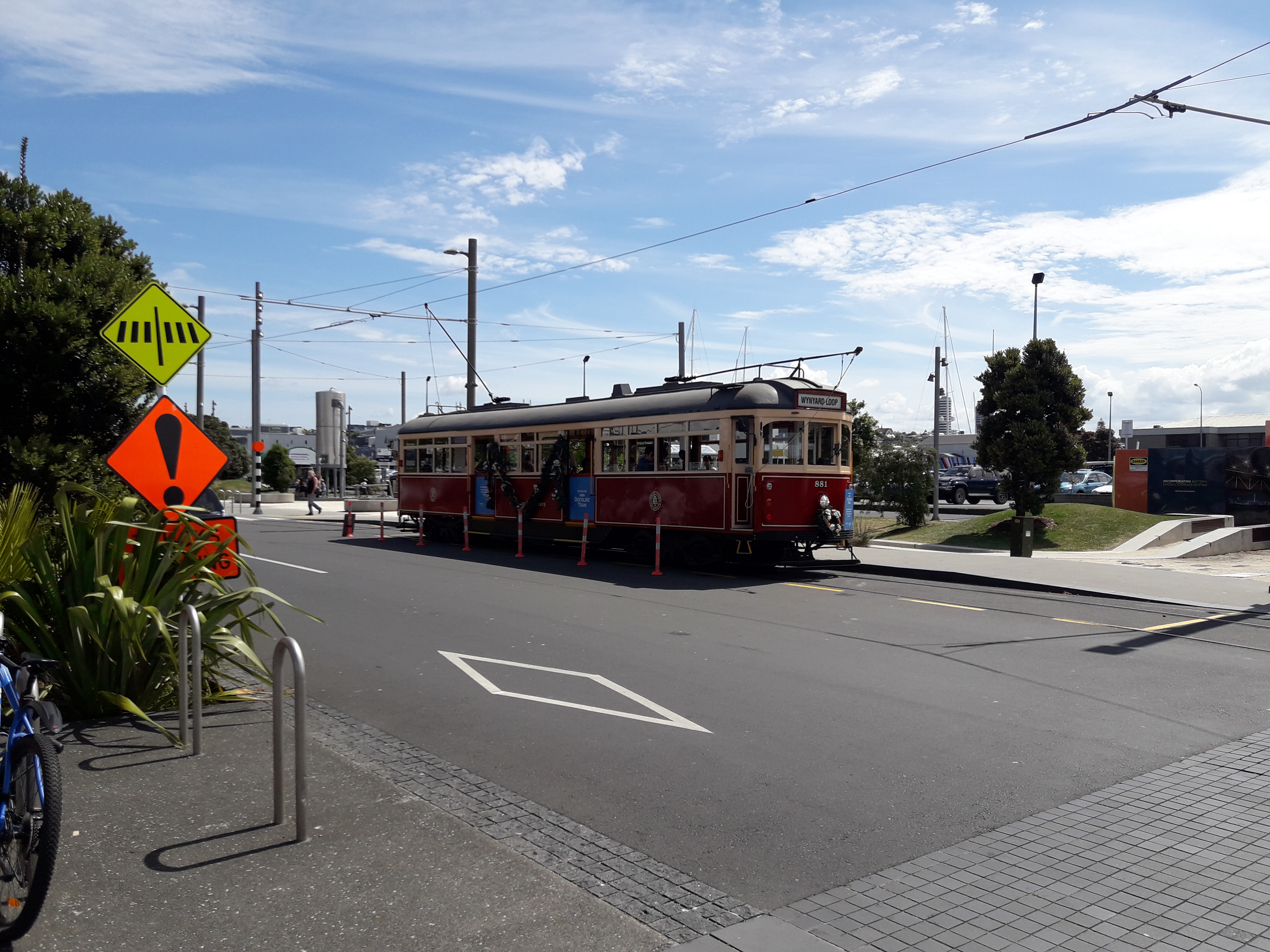
A tram outside the Auckland Fish Market, Wynyard Quarter, Auckland

As part of the concept to make the new quarter more interesting, as well as accessible, a new tram circuit was constructed around the quarter, using two heritage trams on a 1.5 km (0.9 mi) $8 million clockwise track. It is hoped that the tram line will later be extended, to serve transport as well as tourist functions for the quarter. Such a link, initially to the Britomart Transport Centre was originally intended to form part of the initial works, but plans to make the new Wynyard Crossing substantial enough to also serve trams was delayed due to the 2008 financial crisis, though the foundations for the interim bridge will be sufficient for a later bridge upgrade.

The tram circuit was proposed by the Campaign for Better Transport and the MOTAT museum, and in Phase 1 includes a 1.5 km (0.9 mi) loop track with 4 stops and separate sidings to house the trams. Commercial service started on 6 August 2011. Phase 2 will be the later extension to Britomart, with no timeframe set. The 1920s trams are leased from Bendigo Tramway Museum in Australia, and are a W2 Class tram with 52 seats for weekends and holidays, and a 32 seat X1 Class tram for mid-week periods. However, the tram system is also able to operate both trams at the same time.

=== Harbour Crossing ===
Earlier feasibility studies saw the possible terminus of a new Waitematā Harbour Crossing (possibly as a tunnel) at Wynyard Point. These have now been shelved by Transit New Zealand, with one remaining option being a longer tunnel to surface near Fanshawe Street or further south along Cook Street, possibly with an underground public transport station somewhere underneath the Tank Farm. A less likely option has also been proposed by Mike Lee, Auckland Regional Council chairman, who suggested a tunnel underneath the Auckland CBD to emerge east of the city centre at Stanley Street, thus avoiding the Central Motorway Junction and city centre traffic.

The plans to connect the new quarter with Victoria Park would make a cut-and-cover tunnel construction possible along the length of the planned Daldy Street boulevard in the Western Reclamation, providing for two public transport and two private vehicle lanes. Light rail was also mentioned as a long-term possibility. However, as it was unlikely that the harbour tunnel section would be built before 2020 at the earliest, coordination with the development of the new quarter would pose some difficulties.

== Economy ==
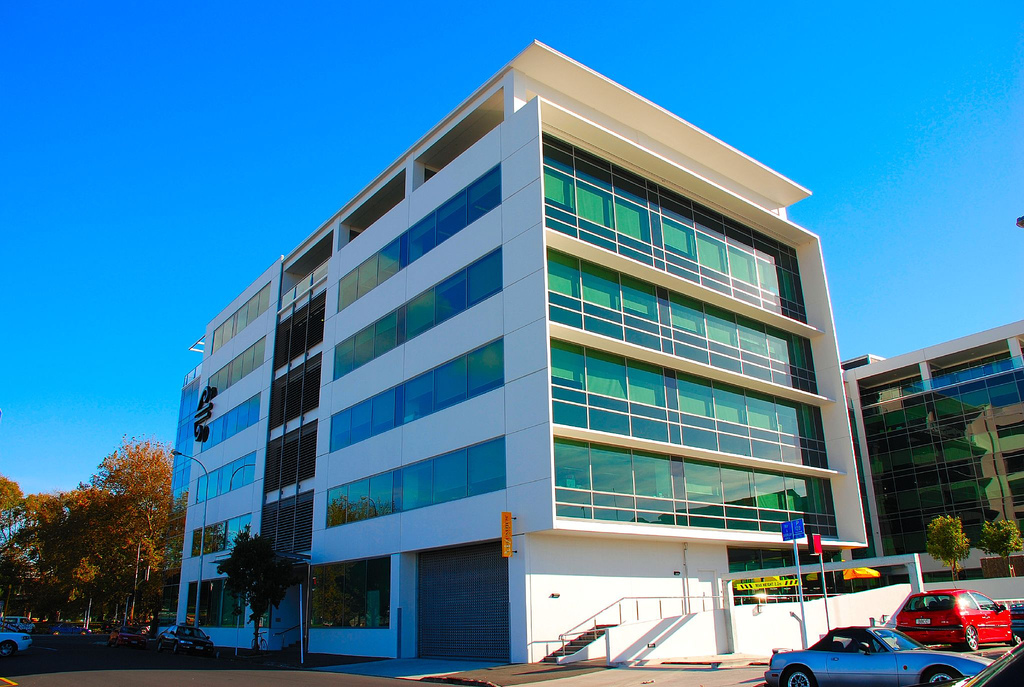
Air New Zealand head office

The Air New Zealand head office is located off of Beaumont and Fanshawe Streets in Western Reclamation Precinct 2. The airline moved there from the Auckland CBD in 2006.

ASB Bank recently built its new headquarters for Auckland at the corner of Jellicoe Street and Halsey Street. Various marine-related industries also exist in the area, with many proposed to be retained even after the transformation of the area. In contrast, some other more industrial developments, such as an aggregate supplier and cement storage facilities, have already moved out of the area by mid-2011.

== See also ==
- Auckland CBD
- Auckland waterfront
- Viaduct Basin
- Westhaven Marina
