= Port of Auckland =

Company administering Auckland's harbour facilities

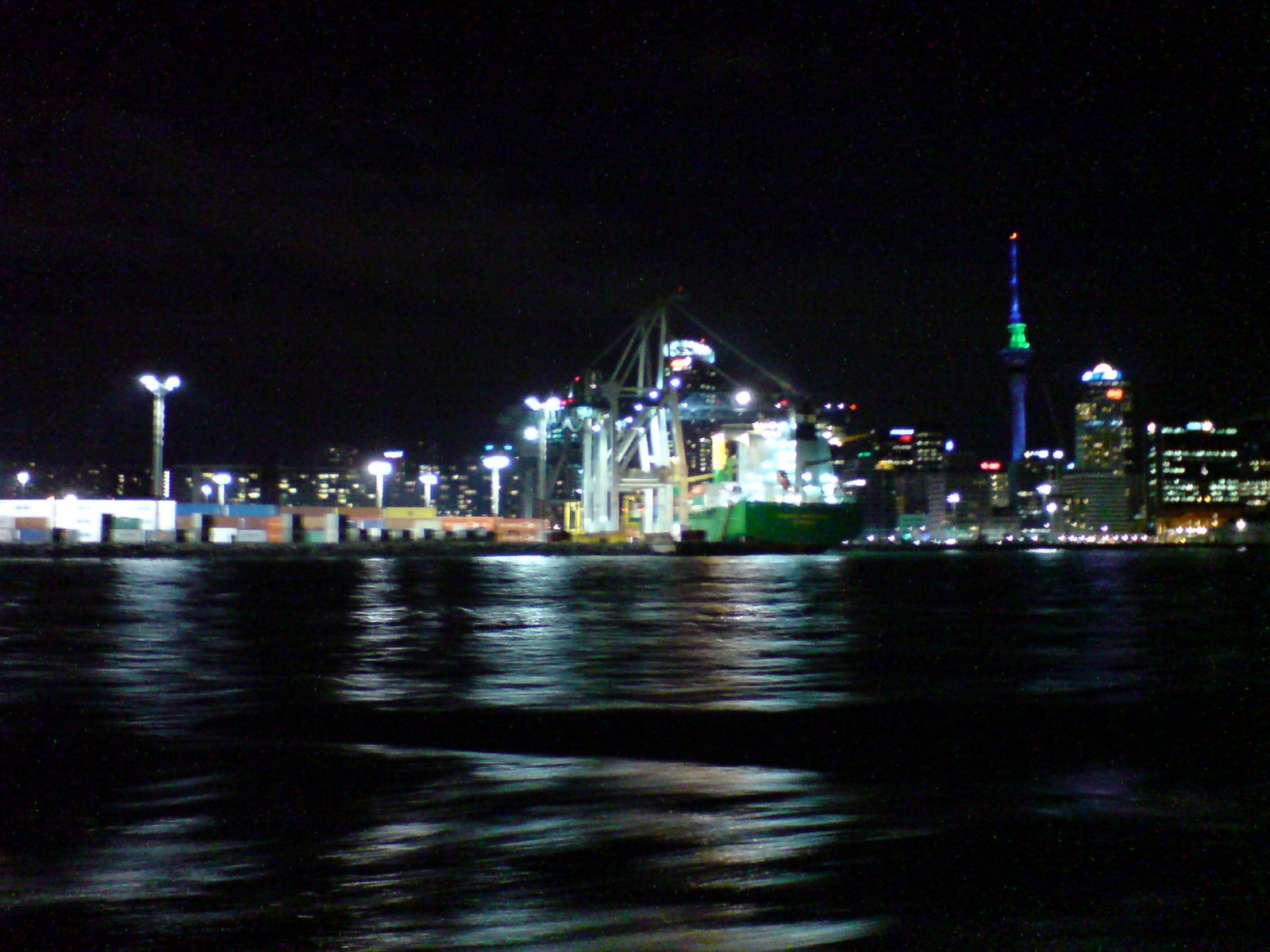
- The wharves at night, operating at all times
- Interactive map of Port of Auckland
- Location within New Zealand
- Native name: Tāmaki Herenga Waka (Māori)

Location
- Country: New Zealand
- Location: Waitematā Harbour
- Coordinates: 36.843774°S 174.776859°E
- UN/LOCODE: NZAKL

Details
- Opened: as Auckland Harbour Board (1871)
- Operated by: Auckland Council
- Owned by: Auckland Council (100%)
- No. of berths: 17
- No. of wharfs: 8
- Draft depth: 13.0 metres (42.7 ft)
- Employees: 770 (direct); 3,000 (contractors and others)

Statistics
- Vessel arrivals: 1,200
- Annual cargo tonnage: 2,000,000 (excluding Ro-Ro)
- Annual container volume: 845,000 TEU
- Passenger traffic: 335,000 (cruise)
- Annual cruise ship visits: 130
- Annual Cars: 208,000 (Ro-Ro)
- Website poal.co.nz

Port of Auckland Limited (POAL), the successor to the Auckland Harbour Board, is the Auckland Council-owned company administering Auckland's commercial freight and cruise ship harbour facilities. As the company operates all of the associated facilities in the Greater Auckland area (excluding the ferry terminals and local marinas for recreational yachting), this article is about both the current company and the ports of Auckland themselves.

== Infrastructure ==
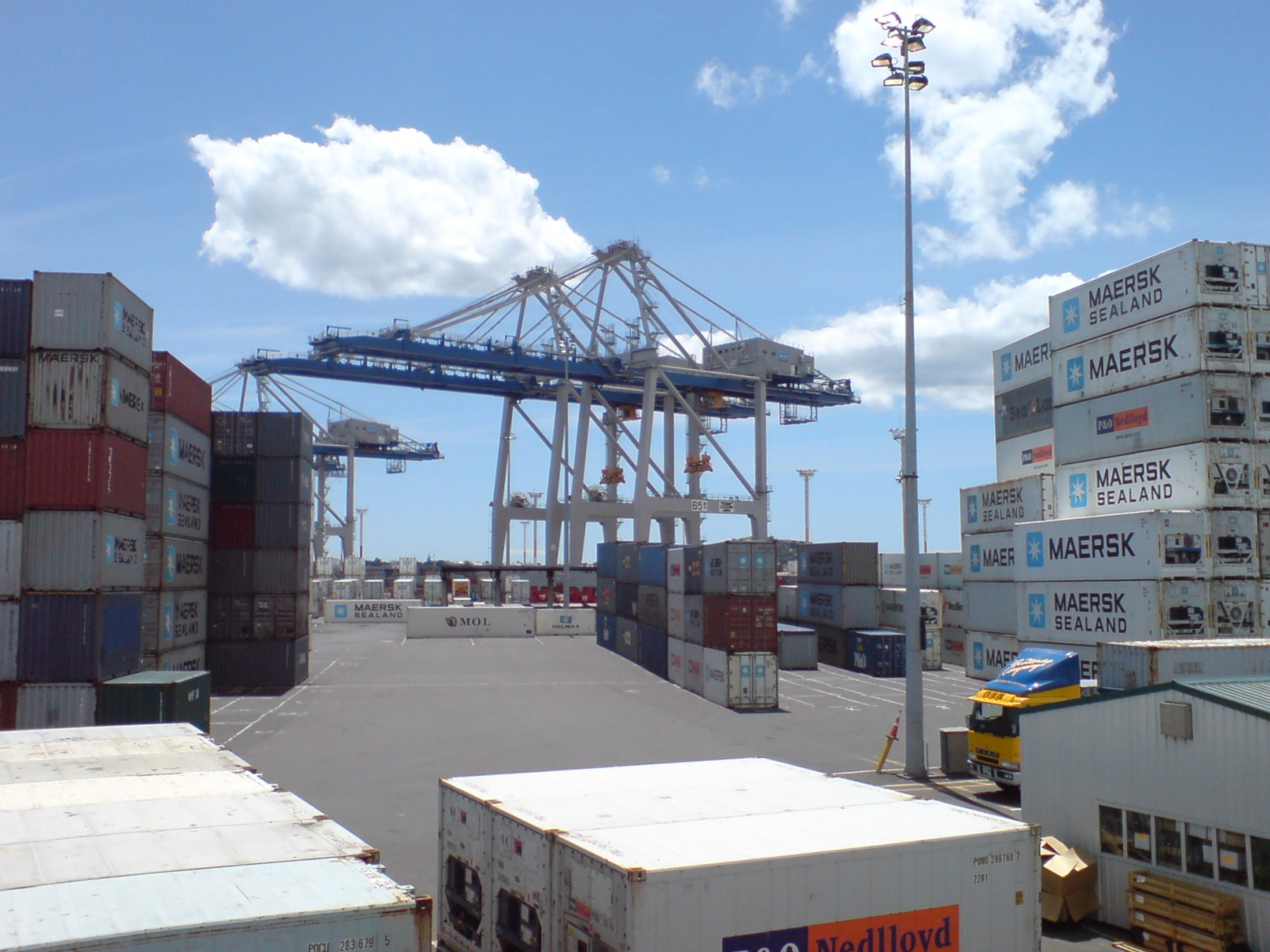
Containers and container cranes on Fergusson Wharf

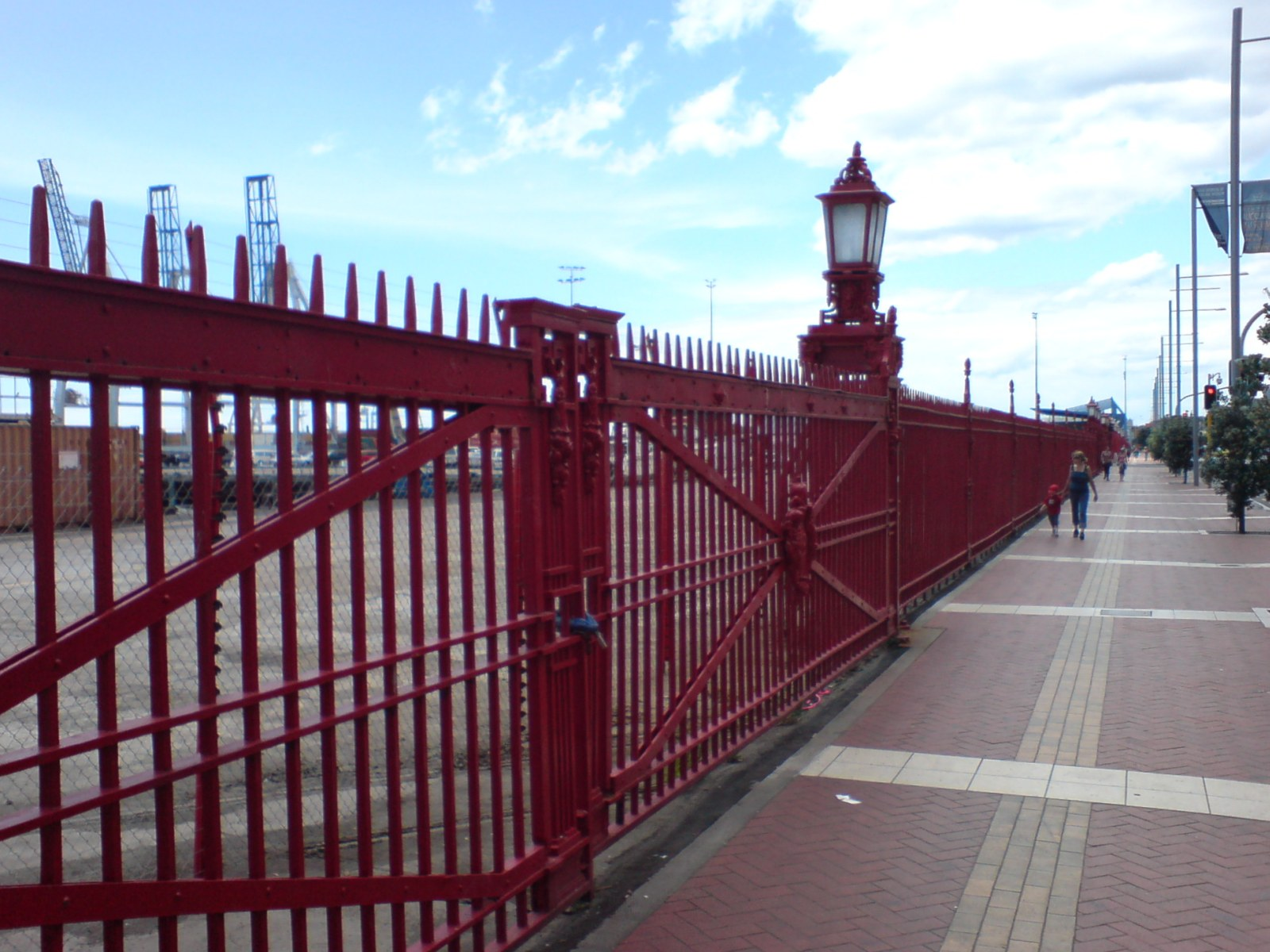
The iconic "Red Fence", the southern edge (customs border) of Captain Cook wharf, on Quay Street

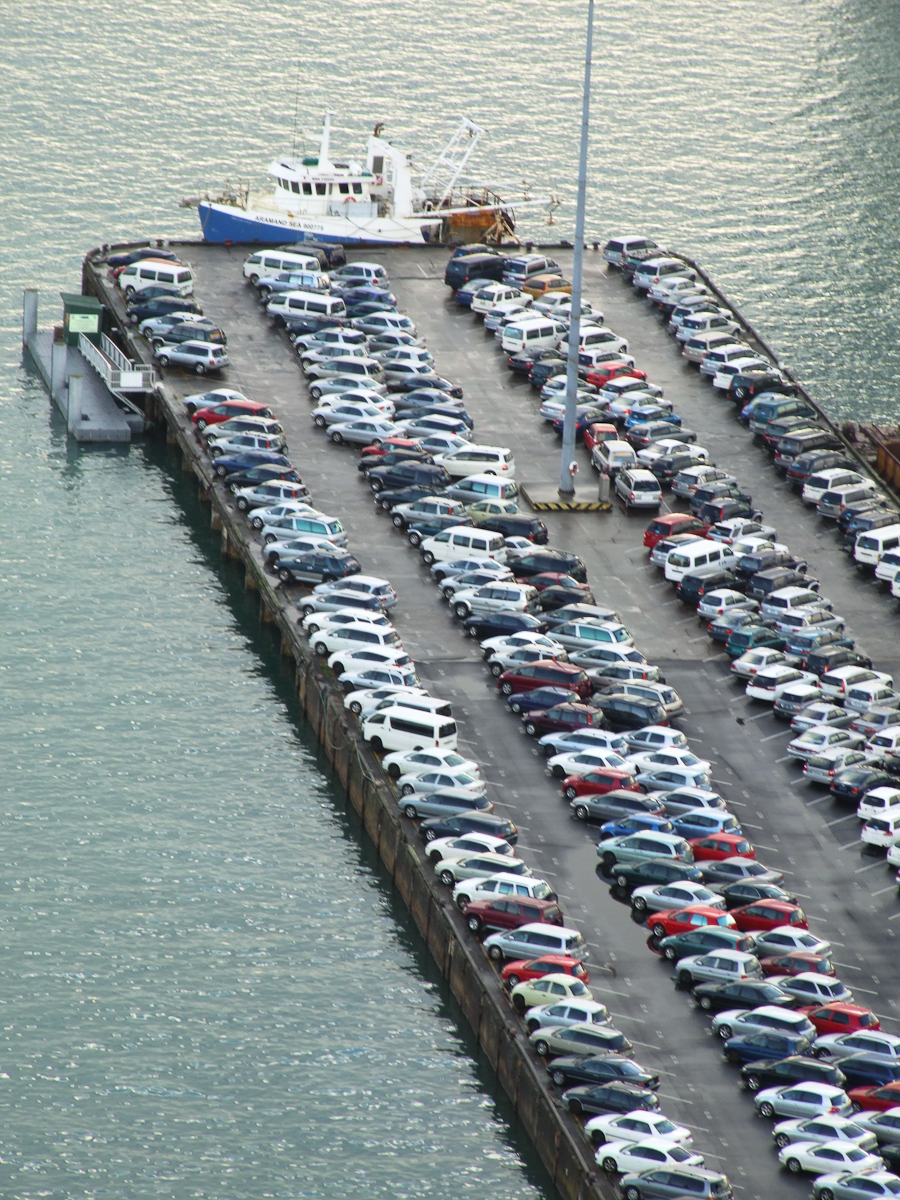
Newly imported cars waiting to be inspected at one of the car yards

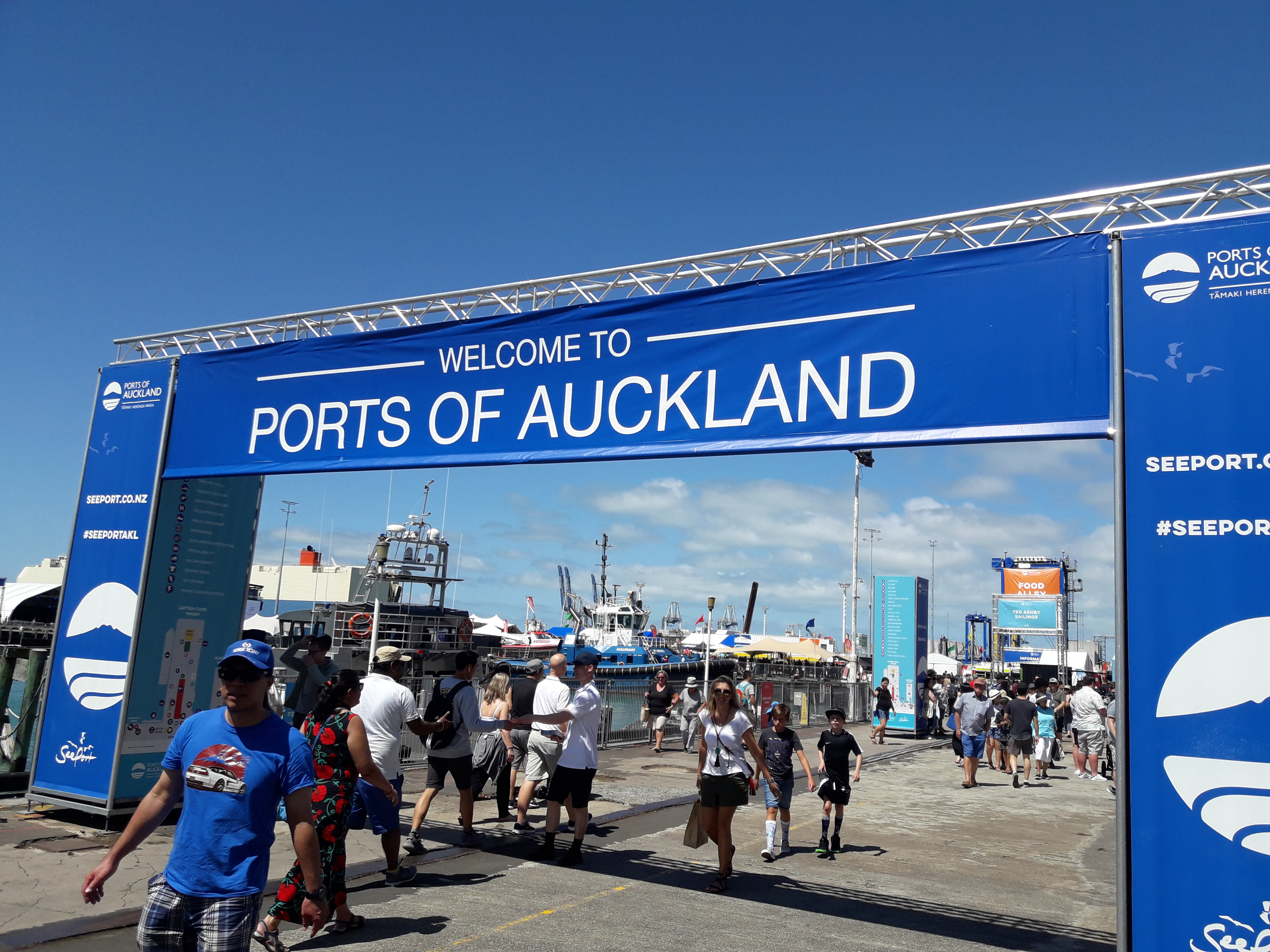
Ports of Auckland Open Weekend on Auckland Anniversary Weekend in 2019

Port of Auckland Limited operates a seaport on the Waitematā Harbour, and four freight hubs (inland ports), in South Auckland, Palmerston North, Mount Maunganui and the Waikato. The company employs the equivalent of 600 full-time staff and is in operation at all hours to allow for quick turnaround of cargo. It also operated a seaport at Onehunga on the Manukau Harbour until the 2010s.

=== Port of Auckland ===
The Port of Auckland is a large container and international trade port on the Waitematā Harbour, lying on the central and eastern Auckland waterfront (north of and adjacent to the Auckland CBD). The 55 hectares (140 acres) of wharves and storage areas (mostly for containers, cars and other large shipments) are almost exclusively situated on reclaimed land, mostly in the former Commercial Bay and Official Bay, and in Mechanics Bay.

Ports of Auckland officially changed its name to Port of Auckland in 2023. The removal of the "s" from "Ports" followed the 2018 sale of the Onehunga seaport to Auckland Council, and the organisation's transition to a single-seaport operation on the Waitematā Harbour.

Wharves (from west to east) are:

- Wynyard Wharf (also known as 'Tank Farm' or 'Western Reclamation', west of Viaduct Basin and mostly used for chemicals and liquids storage. It is to be turned into a mixed-use development and a park within the next decades). This land is now owned and administered by Panuku Development Auckland, a council-controlled organisation.
- Princes Wharf (residential development and cruise ship terminal). An easement around the edge wharf provides for emergency services and ship berthing (such as when cruise ships visit)
- Queens Wharf (proposed additional cruise ship terminal). This land is also now owned and administered by Panuku Development Auckland.
- Captain Cook Wharf
- Marsden Wharf
- Bledisloe Wharf (on which Stadium New Zealand in 2006 was proposed to be built)
- Jellicoe Wharf
- Freyberg Wharf
- Fergusson Wharf (a very large container trade reclamation from the 1960s)

Three new large container cranes arrived in 2018 from Chinese firm Zhenhua Port Machinery Co. for NZ$20 million each, now installed at the north end of Fergusson Container Terminal. The cranes are the largest in New Zealand, weighing 2,100 tonnes each. Standing 114 m (374 ft) high with a 70 m (230 ft) boom length, they are capable of lifting four 20-foot (6.1 m) containers at once. They were bought to provide the necessary lifting capacity and reach for Post-Panamax ships. Each crane has enough solar panels on them to power an average New Zealand home.

Ports of Auckland Limited made a commitment to be Zero Emission by 2040. It bought the world's first full-size, fully electric port tug, a Damen RSD-E Tug 2513, from Dutch company Damen Shipyards. It has a 70 tonne bollard pull, the same as the port's strongest diesel tug Hauraki, also built by Damen. The tug arrived in 2022.

=== Port of Onehunga ===
There was a smaller second port at Onehunga on the Manukau Harbour, on the southern side of the Auckland isthmus. While it is much closer to the industrial areas of South Auckland, the access via the shallow entrance of Manukau Harbour, and the smaller facilities, made it much less significant than the main port. It was used mostly for coastal shipping within New Zealand. The port, despite being 100 nautical miles closer to Sydney and 200 nautical miles closer to Wellington, was never able to be developed to the same extent as the Waitematā Harbour ports, due to the extensive sand bars at the mouth of the Manukau Harbour. Shipping of cement to Onehunga from Westport ceased in mid-2016.

The port flourished in the 1850s and early 1860s as a link to the Manukau Harbour and Waikato regions, where Tāmaki Māori and Waikato tribes would sell and barter resources such as peaches, melons, fish and potatoes, to be on-sold for the settlement of Auckland. This trade was halted due to the invasion of the Waikato in 1863, and while the port continued to be used for passengers and cargo, it became disused over time due to the construction of more reliable road and rail links to Wellington.

Modern ships became too large to use the port, and negotiations were under way in 2015 by Auckland Council to sell it to the council entity Panuku Development Auckland, which wanted to turn it into a waterfront village, apartments and shops in a style similar to Wynyard Quarter. The sale did not go through and in 2016 it was announced that the port would be sold to NZ Transport Agency (NZTA), which wanted to build an interchange for a $1.8 billion east–west motorway link on the land. It was claimed that NZTA had not yet finalised its plans for the interchange and any land remaining after it was built would be sold to Panuku. Ports of Auckland sold Onehunga Wharf to Panuku in 2018.

=== Chelsea Wharf ===
Chelsea Wharf, in Birkenhead on the North Shore, not part of the current POAL facilities, serves the Chelsea Sugar Refinery, which has operated since 1884. The 9 hectares (22 acres) of the land were leased from POAL, but purchased by Chelsea in 1997. Ships with unrefined sugar (mostly from Australia) arrive at the wharf every six weeks, and as they generally exceed 500 gross tonnage (GT), the ships are legally required to use pilotage, managed by the Ports of Auckland's Harbour Control.

=== Inland ports ===
The four inland ports operated by Port of Auckland function as rail exchanges between the seaport and the national road and rail freight networks.

== Turnover ==
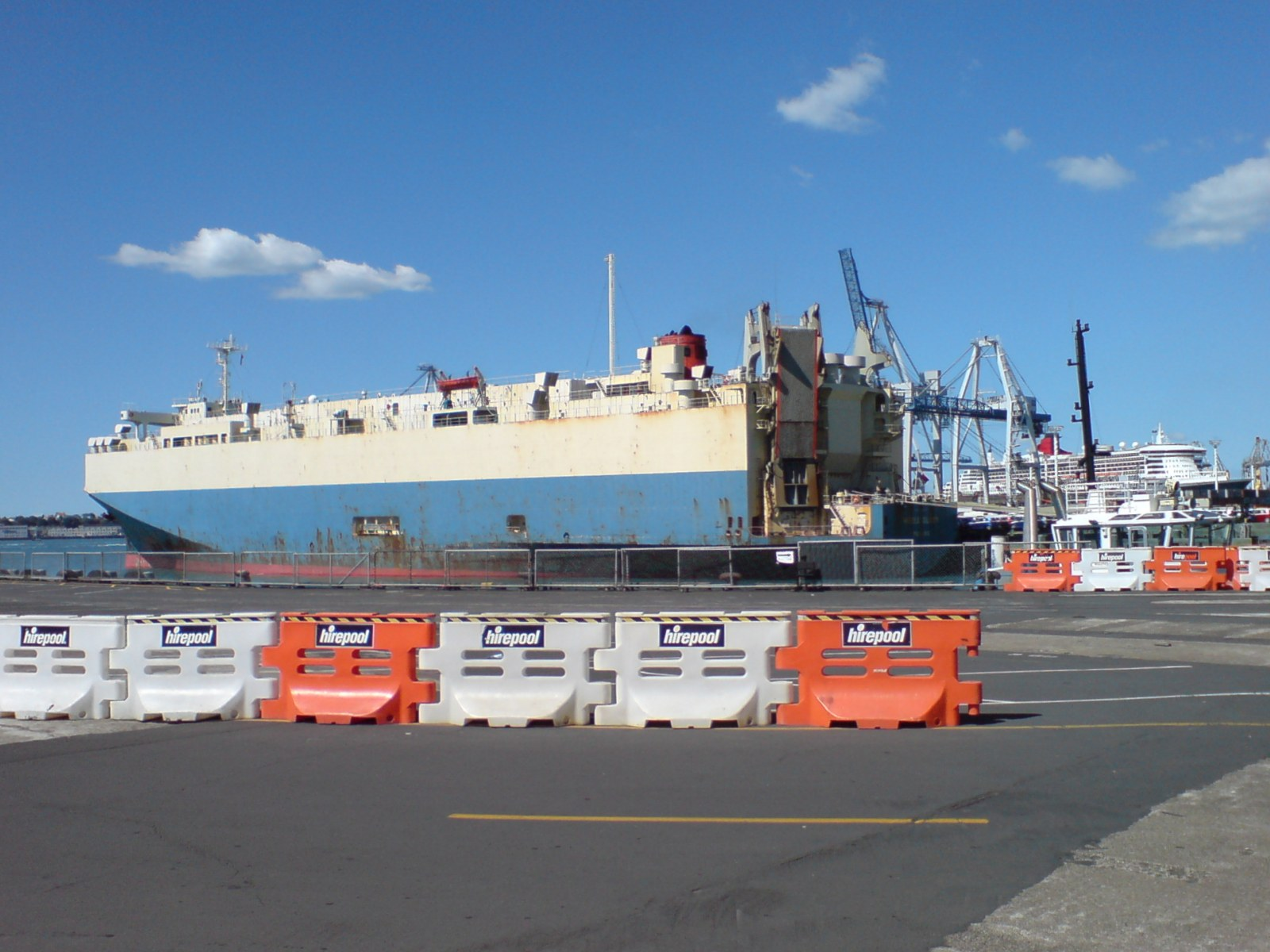
A roll-on/roll-off ship at Captain Cook Wharf, with Queen Mary 2 in the background

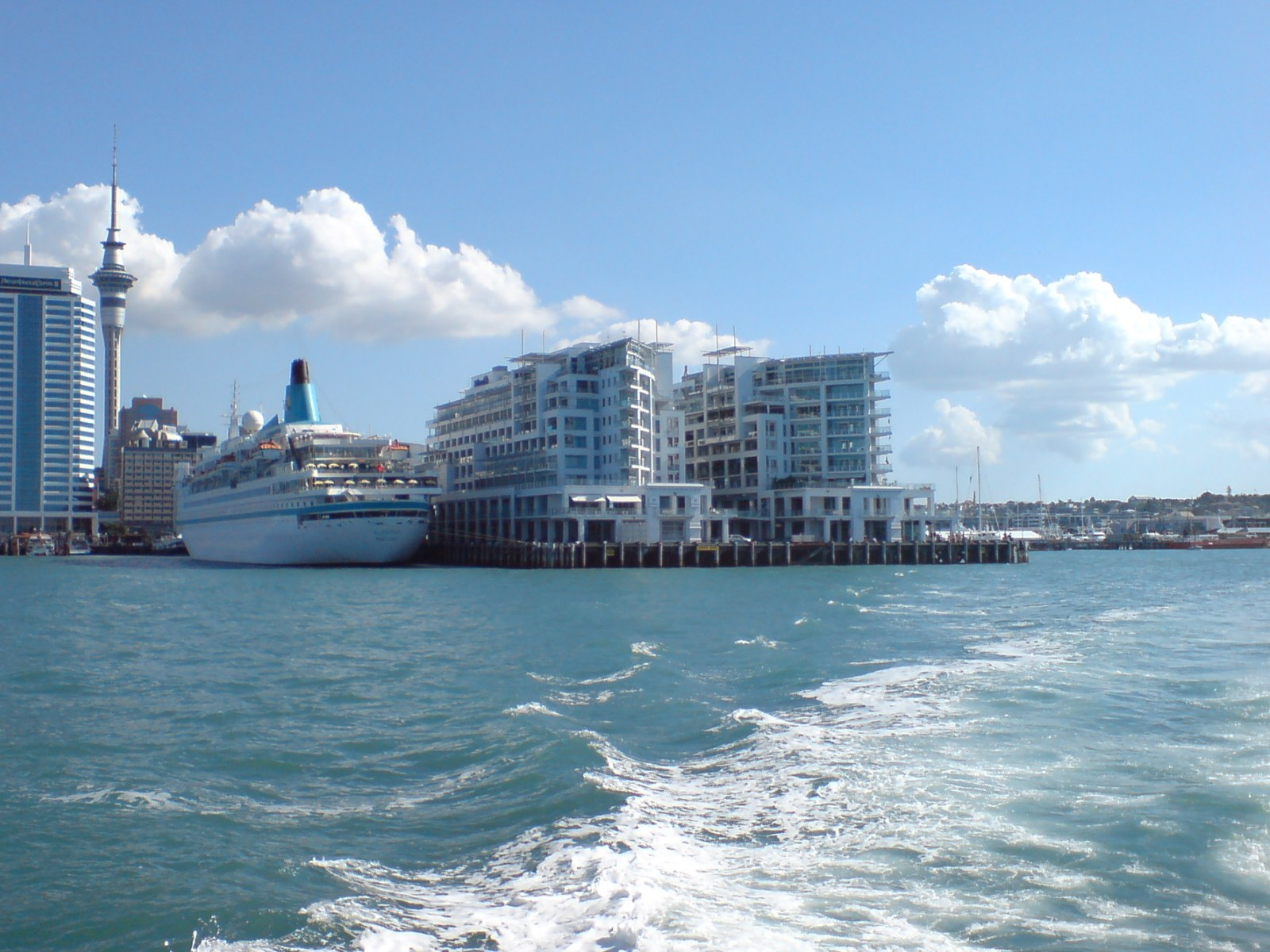
A cruise ship at Princes Wharf, Auckland's Overseas Passenger Terminal

=== Freight ===
Visited by around 1,600 commercial vessels a year, Auckland is New Zealand's largest commercial port, handling more than NZ$20 billion of goods per year. Ports of Auckland handles the movement of 60% of New Zealand's imports and 40% of its exports (both by value, 2006), respectively 50% of the North Island's container trade, and 37% of all New Zealand's container trade (2007). It moves 4 million tonnes of 'breakbulk' cargo per year (2006), as well as around 773,160 twenty-foot equivalent containers units per year (2007).

Another major import are used cars, with approximately 250,000 landed per year. The cars are mainly relatively new Japanese models, due to the very strict technical requirements of the Japanese road authorities. Due to the country's very strict biosecurity regulations, formerly administered by the MAF and now by its successor agency MPI, cars (and many other goods) have to pass through a decontamination facility, which strongly increases turnover times.

=== Cruise ships ===
In the 2005/2006 season, POAL catered for 48 cruise ship visits (at the Overseas Passenger Terminal, Princes Wharf), with more than 100,000 passengers passing through the port, mostly disembarking for short stopover trips into Auckland or the surrounding region. Each of the ships is estimated to add about NZ$1 million to the regional economy. For 2007/2008, the total was forecast at 73 ship visits, another strong increase.

So far, the largest ship to visit was Queen Mary 2, which had to be diverted to Jellicoe Wharf in the freight part of the port due to its size. However, the largest one-day turnover came in February 2007, when Statendam and Sapphire Princess were due in Auckland to exchange around 8,000 people at the terminal, the equivalent of 19 Boeing 747 jumbo jets.

In 2013, Auckland won a major cruise ship industry award, being named Best Turnaround Destination (best location to start or end a cruise at) by Britain's Cruise Insight magazine based on a survey of industry leaders.

== Economic impact ==
According to an economic impact assessment, 173,000 jobs in the Auckland Region rely on trade through the ports and the ports affect a third of the local economy. Ports of Auckland is 100% held by the Auckland Council. Annual dividends to Auckland Regional Holdings and its predecessors in the 15 years to 2006 totalled NZ$500 million.

== History ==
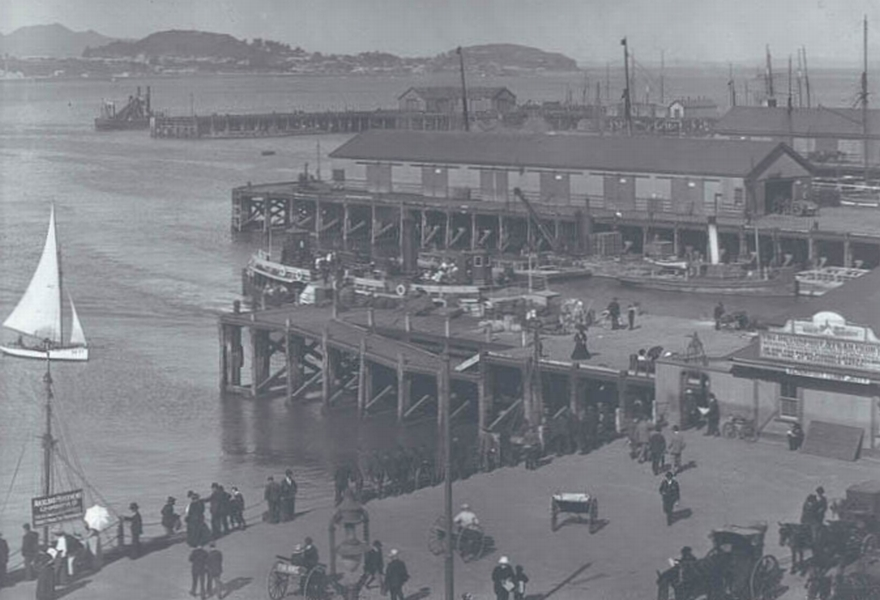
The current centre of the working port is further east than in historical times. Visible here are the wharves near the site of the current Auckland Ferry Terminal in 1905.

Auckland's trade, by virtue of being the (now) largest city of an island colony nation, has to a large degree always depended on its harbours. Starting from the original wharves in Commercial Bay in the 1840s, and expanding via the land reclamation schemes that transformed the whole of the Auckland waterfront throughout the 19th and 20th centuries (and still continue today, especially at Fergusson Wharf), the port became the largest of New Zealand (and has been since at least 1924, incidentally the same year the Port of Onehunga was opened).

=== 19th century ===
The initial establishment of the harbour facilities in Commercial Bay and Official Bay suffered from the tidal mudflats that made establishing good wharves difficult. After control of the Waitematā Harbour passed to the Auckland Provincial Council in 1853, the Council did much work on improving the facilities, which included constructing the first Queen Street Wharf, building a quay along Customs Street and a breakwater at Point Britomart.

After the Auckland Harbour Board was established in 1871 by the council, further wharves were added and massive reclamation works were undertaken, eventually making Freemans Bay and Mechanics Bay lose their natural shoreline, while Commercial Bay (today the site of much of the Auckland CBD and the Auckland waterfront) was totally lost to history. The newly reclaimed land allowed the construction of a railway wharf and new dockyard facilities. New facilities were also built on the other side of the harbour, at Devonport, with the 'Calliope Dock' being the largest drydock in the southern hemisphere in 1888.

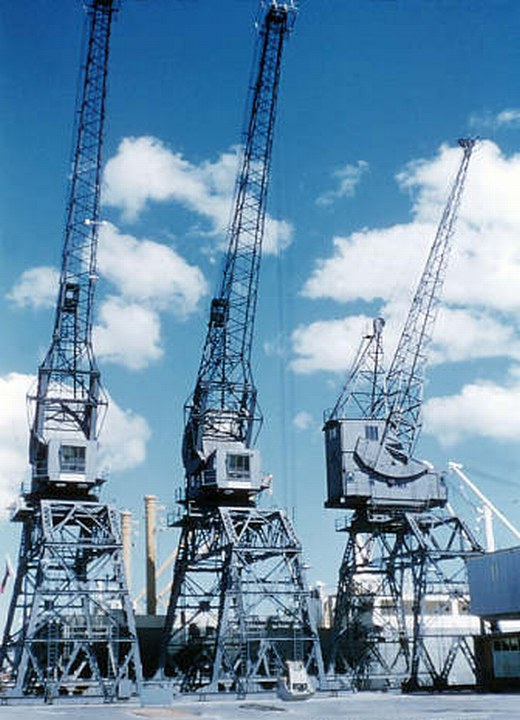
Cranes on Jellicoe Wharf in 1960

=== 20th century ===
By the early 20th century, commercial and passenger traffic was already very busy, with large passenger liners from Europe and the United States arriving regularly. Though the Second World War collapsed the nascent tourist trade, the US entering the war in 1941 led to it basing a part of its fleet operations in Auckland, necessitating further expansion of the harbour facilities. In 1943 alone, 104 warships and 284 transports visited Auckland. During this time, 24/7 operations began.

After the war, the expansion continued, with the Import and Freyberg Wharves opening in 1961, as well as the creation of the Overseas Passenger Terminal on Princess Wharf. During the late 1960s, the massive, deep-draught Fergusson Wharf was established to serve the beginning container trade. While finished in 1971, it took until 1973 for the first container vessel to arrive, though the general container trend was not to avoid the port.

In 1985, the Harbour Board's computer system was broken into by a teenaged hacker. Although it was not the first hacking incident to be reported in New Zealand, it was one of the first to feature in a major TV news story.

==== Corporatisation ====
In 1988 the Auckland Harbour Board and operations of the port were corporatised and handed over to a newly formed company, Ports of Auckland, by Act of Parliament. The change in management increased productivity, but also led to substantial cuts in the directly employed workforce.

In October 1993 20% of the shares were floated to the public on the New Zealand sharemarket when the Waikato Regional Council sold its stake. On 1 April 2005 Auckland Regional Holdings, part of the former Auckland Regional Council, which held the remaining 80% of shares in the company, made a takeover offer at $8 a share. This gave the company a value of $848 million. The bid was successful, and the port is now 100% owned by the Auckland Council, successor of the Auckland Regional Council and other local authorities.

From 2012 to 2019, Auckland Council Investments Limited (ACIL), the council-controlled organisation responsible for non-transport investment assets, managed the 100% share of Ports of Auckland Limited. In 2019, as part of the 10-year budget 2018-2028, ACIL was disestablished, its share holdings and functions were transferred to the council

=== 21st century ===
Now being the third largest container terminal in Australasia, as well as New Zealand's busiest port, little remains in terms of the original facilities. Even so, Ports of Auckland is still expanding and changing at a quick pace, with further reclamation worked planned to shift harbour operations further east, in connection with future needs as well as the plans for a more accessible Auckland waterfront.

In 2007, with a big increase in shipping traffic being projected (due to the Maersk shipping line choosing Auckland as a hub for the Fonterra export traffic), POAL considered a merger with Port of Tauranga, which did not come to pass. In the same year, volumes at the port rose 12.6% while profits, after deducting one-time items and property investments unrelated to the port operation, remained similar to 2006 (then NZ$55.9 million).

In its 2008 plan, POAL proposed to extend the Fergusson and Bledisloe terminals into one large area mainly intended for container handling. The change is to increase the port's capacity by 250%, and allow ships with up to 7,000 containers to use its facilities, where the current limit is about 4,000. The extension would include the purchase of even larger cranes, topping out at 94m, while containers on the wharf may be stacked as high as six-storey buildings.

In 2009, POAL noted that while container business in the past year had increased and profits in that sector had grown due to productivity gains and more consolidation of the industry towards larger ports like Auckland, there was a significant reduction in car import business due to the recession, which reduced the company's profits by 26% to $12.6m for the last half year to 31 December 2008.

From early 2010, Ports of Auckland has operated a new inland port / rail siding in Wiri to connect road freight to the port facilities via freight trains. The new facility allows Ports of Auckland to reduce the number of trucks that have to travel through the Auckland Central area by up to 100,000 trips a year.

On 30 June 2020, Ports of Auckland deployed a graphical planning solution. In August 2020 a falling container killed worker Pala'amo Kalati. A crane was lifting two containers, when a third container was accidentally lifted, and fell on Kalati. On 1 December 2023, Ports of Auckland was ordered to pay $561,000, along with $90,000 to Maritime New Zealand. There were also deaths in April 2022.

On 7 May 2024, Mayor of Auckland Wayne Brown abandoned plans to sell the Ports of Auckland on a long-term lease. Brown, Ports of Auckland chief executive Roger Gray and Maritime Union secretary Grant Williams signed an agreement for the Auckland Council to retain port lands, assets and operations. In addition the Ports agreed to return Captain Cook Wharf and Marsden Wharf to the Auckland Council, and to give the public greater access to Bledisloe Wharf. The Auckland Council and the council-controlled organisation Eke Panuku Development Auckland also developed a framework plan to redevelop Auckland's waterfront.

== Industrial dispute ==
In late 2011, Ports of Auckland became engaged in an industrial dispute with workers represented by the Maritime Union of New Zealand, after negotiations broke down over the expiry of the existing collective contract, and plans by the port to contract out its services to casual workers. The company board cited a Productivity Commission report calling for greater flexibility in the ports industry, and the need to compete with its nearest rival, Port of Tauranga. The International Transport Workers' Federation (ITF) and International Longshore and Warehouse Union (ILWU) later became involved, warning that Ports of Auckland could be declared the world's first 'port of convenience'. Port workers in other parts of the country briefly downed tools in support of the striking Auckland workers, before being ordered to get back to work.

On 7 March 2012, the Port announced that all striking dock workers would be made redundant. This prompted a strong response from the striking port workers, the Maritime Union of New Zealand, and its global affiliates in the ITF, ILWU and Maritime Union of Australia. The ITF's president, Paddy Crumlin, subsequently declared Ports of Auckland a port-of-convenience on 9 March.

A protest march down Auckland's Queen Street was staged on 10 March, with turnout estimated between 2,000 and 5,000.

In response, the Port issued a full-page letter in The Sunday Star-Times, arguing that the port workers earned on average $91,000 for a 26-hour working week. These figures have been disputed by the Maritime Union of New Zealand, which accused the Port of having casualisation plans all along, and twisting its own figures in order to discredit the union.

Auckland Mayor Len Brown refused to take sides in the dispute, garnering criticism from supporters, but offered to mediate in the dispute. In December 2012, the Port was fined NZD$40,000 by the Employment Relations Authority for deliberately employing strikebreakers during the dispute.

In late 2013, it was reported that the dispute remained unresolved. However, a new collective settlement was finally reached in February 2015.

== SeePort open weekend ==
Ports of Auckland hold its annual open weekend, called SeePort, on Auckland Anniversary Weekends to showcase the public its ports and the history of Auckland's shipping industry and Auckland's maritime heritage.

== See also ==
- Auckland Harbour Board v CIR
