= Auckland waterfront =

Area of Auckland, New Zealand

Coordinates: 36.842700°S 174.764292°E

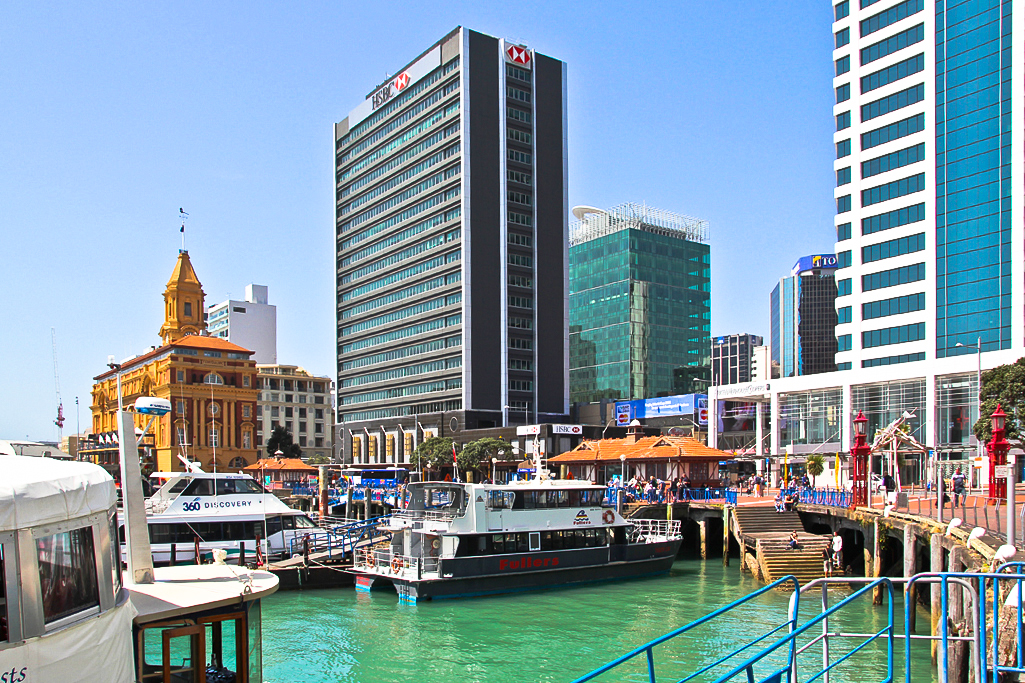
The Auckland waterfront.

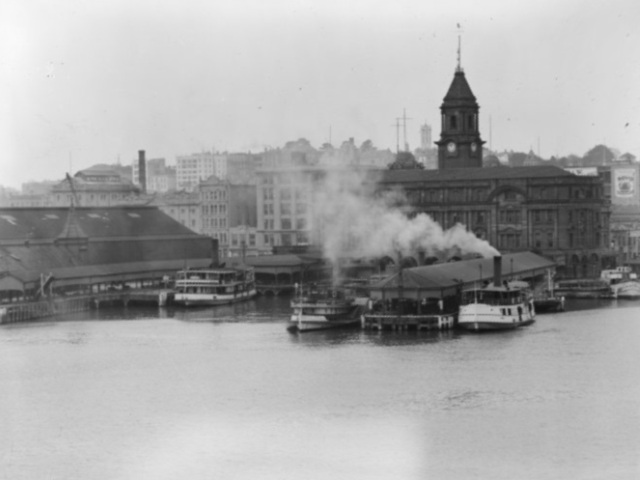
The Auckland waterfront in 1912, with steam ferries at the ferry quay.

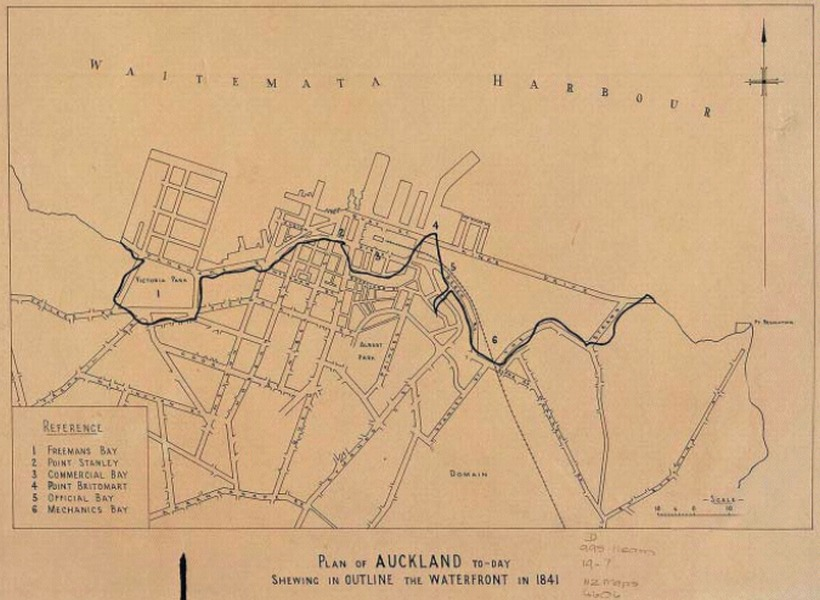
Plan of the Auckland waterfront ca. 1930, with the older coastline of 1841 also shown as a darker line.

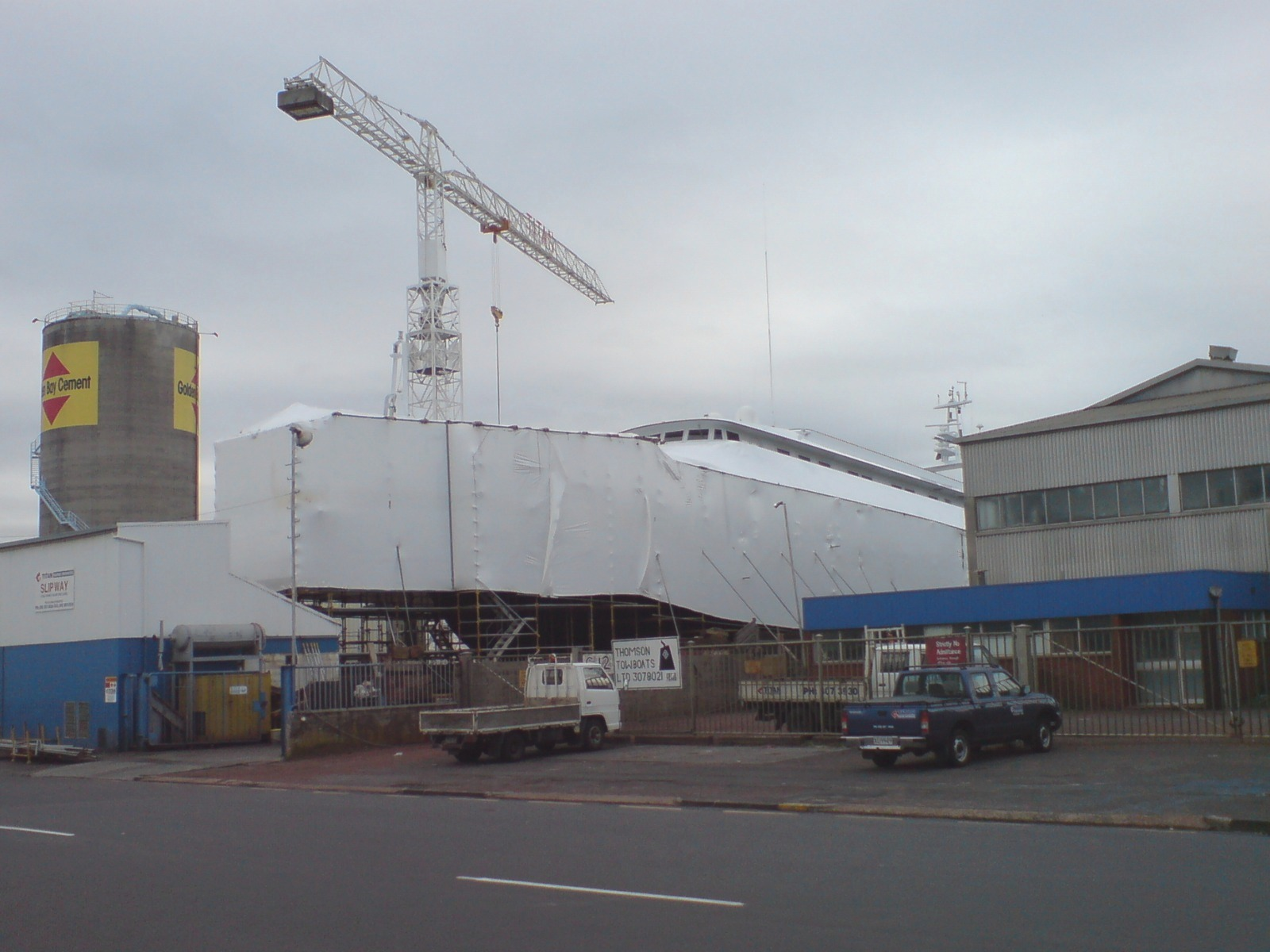
Shipbuilding and other marine companies abound on the Western Reclamation, next to industrial uses.

The Auckland waterfront (rarely the Auckland harbourfront) is a city-side stretch of the southern Waitematā Harbour coastline in Auckland, New Zealand. Previously mostly dominated by Ports of Auckland uses, from the 2000s on it is becoming increasingly open to recreational public use, with a number of former wharves being converted to office, entertainment, and later also some residential uses.

== Extents ==
The waterfront stretches roughly from the suburb of Saint Marys Bay / the Auckland Harbour Bridge in the west to the Ports of Auckland areas in the east. However, in most usage, 'Auckland waterfront' only refers to those parts freely accessible to the public (such as around the Viaduct Basin and the Auckland CBD), and thus at the moment excludes much of the Western Reclamation and almost the whole of the Ports of Auckland area to the east.

While Auckland City technically has a second waterfront on the Manukau Harbour, this is never called 'Auckland waterfront'.

== Future ==
During 2006, a prolonged public discussion about the future of the waterfront was begun, first by the start of public consultation on the future of the Western Reclamation, then by the plans for Stadium New Zealand on the land of Ports of Auckland. While the plans for Stadium New Zealand were eventually scrapped (partly because of complaints of some citizens that it would block harbour views, but mostly due to its effect on port operations), the discussion had shown that Aucklanders would prefer greater access to the waterfront, which is at the moment is still industrial land / port land in large areas.

However, Ports of Auckland (the company still owning most of the Auckland wharves) noted that while it will explore plans for greater public access, it needed most of the space for the foreseeable future. As most of the Western Reclamation will not see any immediate transformation (due to ongoing commercial leases and required decontamination before future use), the sights are currently set on extending the public areas of the Viaduct Basin with a new entertainment strip along Jellicoe St to the west of it. This is to be linked by a bridge to the Viaduct and the Auckland CBD, with the bridge design possibly being internationally tendered, and for all works to be completed in time for the Rugby World Cup 2011.

=== Queens Wharf ===
In early 2008, ARC plans were unveiled that may see Queens Wharf, the wharf closest to the Auckland Ferry Terminal, converted into public space. Currently the wharf is used to store ripening bananas and hold import cars before fumigation treatment by Ministry of Agriculture and Forestry staff. However, plans for the specific activities are still up in the air, though a new cruise ship terminal, to support the heavily booked Princes Wharf terminal, seems likely to be part of the mix.

Commentators have remarked that the wharf has been open to the public before during its early working life, when loading took place next to strolling members of the public, recreational fishing and other uses, a kind of life as on a "European square", and that the authorities should try to recreate such a feeling by providing for compatible mixed uses. The Yokohama Passenger Terminal was held up as an example, with port, ferry and customs/immigration facilities contained within a wharf, and with a sweeping public park on the roof of the structure.

=== Economic future ===
A 2010 report by PricewaterhouseCoopers projected that up to 2040, the waterfront would generate $4.29 billion for the economy of the region, and about 13,600 people could be employed in waterfront businesses by that time.

== See also ==
- Auckland CBD
  - Auckland Ferry Terminal
- Bays or former bays:
  - Commercial Bay (reclaimed former bay, now the site of the Auckland CBD)
  - Freemans Bay (reclaimed former bay, now a suburb without waterfront access, blocked by the Viaduct Basin suburb)
  - Mechanics Bay (reclaimed former bay, now a suburb without waterfront access, blocked by the Port of Auckland)
- Ports of Auckland (commercial users of the eastern waterfront)
  - Stadium New Zealand (formerly proposed large sports stadium on the waterfront)
- Princes Wharf (upmarket residential area and cruise ship terminal)
- Viaduct Basin (former fishing and marine use quarter turned into upmarket residential area)
- Western Reclamation (western industrial area to become a public park and residential area)
- Westhaven Marina (west of the Western Reclamation, a large recreational / yachting marina)
