= Queensborough Bridge =

Bridge in New Westminster, British Columbia, Canada

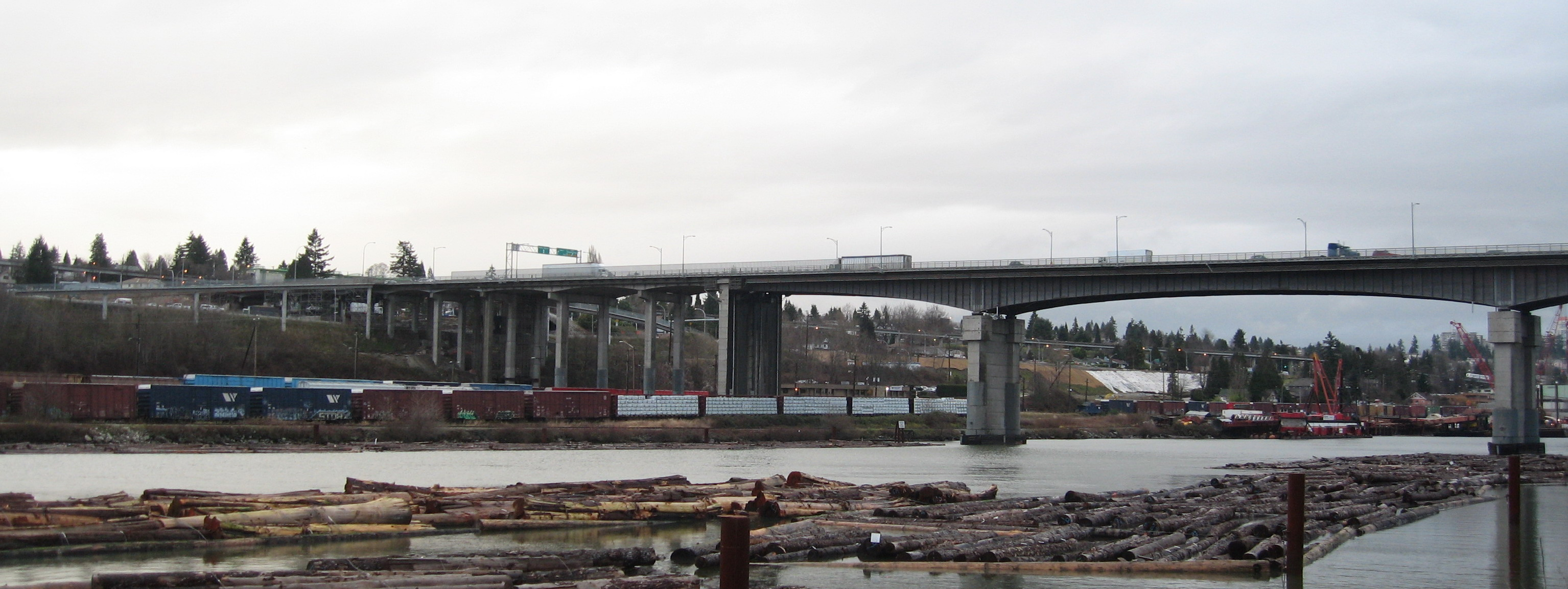
- The Queensborough Bridge seen from the south side
- Coordinates: 49.196415°N 122.947183°W
- Carries: Four lanes of British Columbia Highway 91A, pedestrians and bicycles
- Crosses: North Arm Fraser River
- Locale: New Westminster
- Owner: British Columbia Ministry of Transportation and Infrastructure

Characteristics
- Design: Arch bridge
- Total length: 924 m

History
- Designer: Phillips Barrat and Partners
- Constructed by: John Laing and Son (Canada Ltd.)
- Construction cost: $4 Million ($37.5 million in 2022)
- Opened: August 26, 1960

Statistics
- Daily traffic: 81,000 (July 2021)

Location
- Interactive map of Queensborough Bridge

Queensborough Bridge is a highway bridge in New Westminster, British Columbia. It was built in 1960 by John Laing and Son (Canada) for the City of New Westminster and cost CA$4 million (equivalent to $37.5 million in 2022). The bridge spans the north arm of the Fraser River for road access from the main part of New Westminster to the suburb of Queensborough at the east end of Lulu Island, giving the bridge its name.

It has since become a part of Highway 91A feeder to Highway 91 to the south. The Queensborough was a toll bridge costing 25 cents to cross until the bridge was bought by the provincial government in November 1966. The last person to pay the toll was Premier W. A. C. Bennett, who paid 25 cents at 12:01 AM on Sunday, November 19, 1966.

Six spans of the bridge were demolished and replaced in 1984 and 1985 to allow for a curve alignment on its southern approach to Queensborough Connector. In 2003, some adjustments were made to the approach from the New Westminster side. Later in 2009, the interchange with Marine Way and Stewardson Way saw improvements, including the trumpet loop being flipped to its current rotation.

== See also ==
- List of bridges in Canada
- List of crossings of the Fraser River
