= British Columbia Highway 91A =

Highway in British Columbia

Highway 91A
- Queensborough Connector
- Highway 91A highlighted in red.

Route information
- Maintained by the Ministry of Transportation and Infrastructure
- Length: 3.4 km (2.1 mi)
- Existed: 1990–present

Major junctions
- South end: Highway 91 in Richmond
- North end: Marine Way/Stewardson Way in New Westminster

Location
- Country: Canada
- Province: British Columbia
- Major cities: New Westminster, Richmond

Highway system
- British Columbia provincial highways
← Highway 91	→ Highway 93

Highway 91A, or the Queensborough Connector, is a 3 km (2 mi) long spur off Highway 91. Highway 91A crosses the Queensborough Bridge and terminates at Marine Way, allowing traffic into New Westminster. Residents of New Westminster can use Highway 91A as a convenient route towards the Canada/U.S. border. Although the Queensborough Bridge has existed since 1960, the highway spur section was opened only in 1986, at the same time the first section of Highway 91 was completed. (All of Highway 91A was once known as Highway 91 until the east-west portion of Highway 91 was built in the late 1980s; the route was redesignated as an alternate after that time.)

Highway 91A, in addition to being known as an extension of the Annacis Highway, is also known as the Queensborough Connector.

The junction of Highways 91 and 91A was converted to an interchange in the late 1990s.

The interchange with Marine Way was reconstructed in the late 2000s as part of a $211-million-dollar project to improve access to Lower Mainland border crossings. Median barriers were also installed on Highway 91A over the Queensborough Bridge, and the Howes Street intersection was upgraded to a full interchange.

== Exit list ==
The entire route is in Metro Vancouver Regional District.

Location	km	mi	Destinations	Notes
Richmond	0.00	0.00	Highway 91 – Richmond, Vancouver, Alex Fraser Bridge, Delta, Surrey	Highway 91 exit 11
New Westminster	1.99	1.24	Howes Street	Serves Queensborough
New Westminster	2.73– 3.39	1.70– 2.11	Queensborough Bridge over North Arm Fraser River	
New Westminster	3.39	2.11	Marine Way / Stewardson Way – Burnaby, New Westminster	
New Westminster	3.39	2.11	6th Avenue / 20th Street	Northbound exit only; no access from Stewardson Way / Marine Way
New Westminster	3.39	2.11	23rd Street	Northbound exit only, transit vehicles only
1.000 mi = 1.609 km; 1.000 km = 0.621 mi: Incomplete access
