= Reversible lane =

Lane in which traffic may travel in either direction

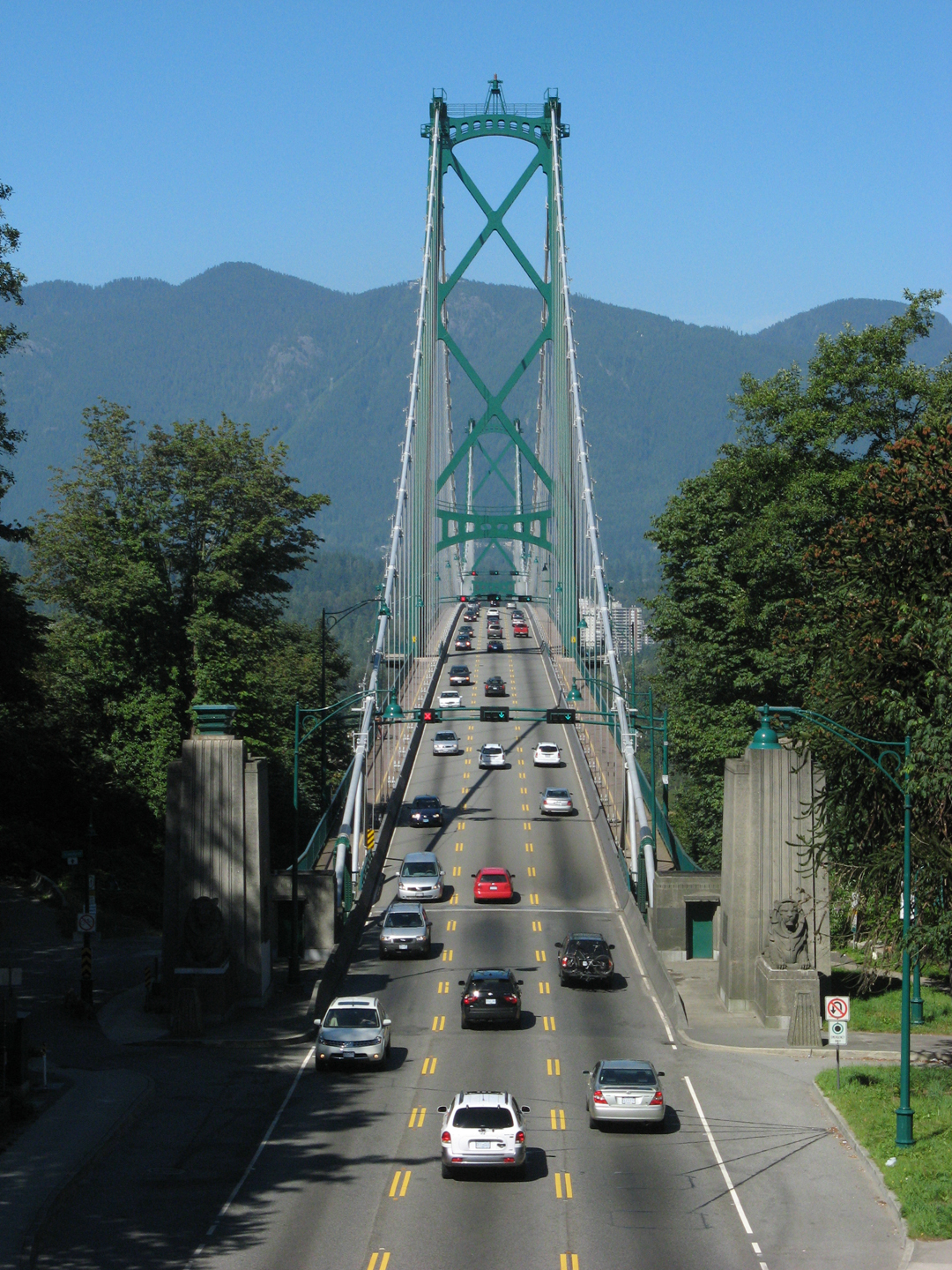
The south end of Lions Gate Bridge in Vancouver, British Columbia

A reversible lane, also known as variable lane, dynamic lane, tidal flow and formerly suicide lane, is a managed lane in which traffic may travel in either direction, depending on certain conditions. Typically, it is meant to improve traffic flow during rush hours, by having overhead traffic lights and lighted street signs notifying drivers which lanes are open or closed to driving or turning.

Reversible lanes are also commonly found in tunnels and on bridges, and on the surrounding roadways – even where the lanes are not regularly reversed to handle normal changes in traffic flow. The presence of lane controls allows authorities to close or reverse lanes when unusual circumstances (such as construction or a traffic mishap) require use of fewer or more lanes to maintain orderly flow of traffic.

== Disambiguation ==
There are similar setups with slightly different usages, although the terms may be commonly used interchangeably.

Contraflow Lane: Typically used to refer to a bus lane running against a one-way street through the opposite direction

Contraflow Lane Reversal: Typically used to refer to a temporary setup of a lane running opposite to normal during special times, such as emergency evacuations, sports tournaments, or road construction/repairs.

Reversible Lane: Typically used to refer to a lane specifically designed to facilitate different directional usage regularly, with changes sometimes as frequent as twice a day.

=== Types ===
There are typically three types of reversible lanes:

- reversible travel-lanes - for travelling a longer distance
- median passing lanes - for a quick overtaking
- median turning lanes - for stopping to turn into a facility

While reversible lane is a commonly used term, other terms include variable lanes, dynamic lanes, and flex lanes.

== Separation of flows ==
Some more recent implementations of reversible lanes use a movable barrier to establish a physical separation between allowed and disallowed lanes of travel. In some systems, a concrete barrier is moved during low-traffic periods to switch a central lane from one side of the road to another; some examples are the five-lane San Diego-Coronado Bay Bridge in San Diego, California, the seven-lane Alex Fraser Bridge on the Fraser River in Vancouver and the eight-lane Auckland Harbour Bridge across the Waitemata Harbour in Auckland, New Zealand. Other systems use retractable cones or bollards which are built into the road, or retractable fences which can divert traffic from a reversible ramp. The two center lanes of the six-lane Golden Gate Bridge are reversible; they are southbound during morning rush hour and northbound at evening rush hour. Prior to the installation of a movable median barrier in January 2015, they were demarcated by vertical yellow markers placed manually in sockets in the roadway.

Many urban freeways have entirely separate carriageways (and connecting ramps) to hold reversible lanes (the reversible lanes in such a configuration are often referred to as "express lanes"). Generally, traffic flows in one direction or another in such a configuration (or not at all); the carriageways are not "split" into two-lane roadways during non-rush periods. Typically, this sort of express lane will have fewer interchanges than the primary lanes, and many such roadways only provide onramps for inbound traffic, and offramps for outbound traffic.

== Passing lanes ==
Typical striping on an old-style suicide lane setup in the United States

Historically, the term "suicide lane" has also referred to a lane in the center of a highway meant for passing in both directions. Both directions are permitted to use the lane for passing; the right-of-way is held by vehicles already in the passing lane and entering vehicles must yield. In a similar layout, three lanes are striped with two in one direction and one in the other, but traffic in the direction with one lane is allowed to cross the centerline to pass.

Passing lanes should not be confused with turning lanes. While they look similar, passing lanes are for highway overtaking, while turning lanes typically are used to stop and turn into a parking lot from a street.

2+1 roads have replaced some of these, mainly in Europe.

== Turn lanes and flush medians ==
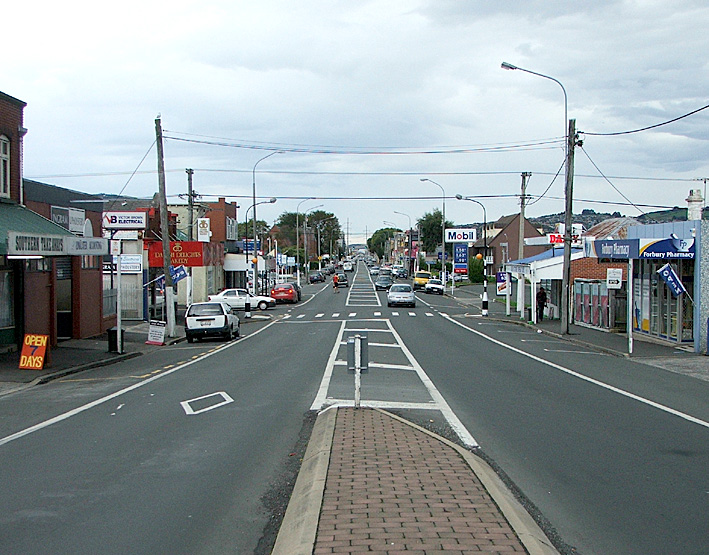
A turn lane (in New Zealand a "flush median") with a raised median in the forefront

A typical five-lane arterial equipped with a center turn lane. These are often found in cities, towns and developed areas near cities. In the United States, the sequence line is located on the inside of the lane (sometimes with left turn arrows for both flows). In Canada it is the same for all provinces with the exception of Ontario, where the sequence line is located on the outside.

Another type of center two-way lane is a "two-way left turn lane" (TWLTL) or "center left-turn lane", or (for countries that drive on the right) "center turn lane" or "median turn lane", a single lane in the center of the road into which traffic from both directions pulls to make a left turn. This lane is also sometimes called a "suicide lane" for its notorious fatality rates, especially in the United States in settings with high traffic speeds (45 mph), and on roads with five or more lanes (typically two or three lanes in each travel direction with one center turn lane). However, some studies have found that converting high-speed four lane streets into three lane streets (one lane of traffic in each direction with a center turn lane) and lowering speed limits can result in improved safety, despite the use of a center turn lane, as traffic collisions occur at far lower speeds.

These roads are very common in suburban areas and less common in rural areas, though they are frequent around developed areas near Interstate Highway bypasses in the United States. Many were divided highways before the median was demolished or otherwise replaced by the turn lane. Many four-lane streets with a center double yellow line are being phased out in favor of 3- or five-lane streets with center turn lanes because the center lane allows for less disruption of traffic flow. For routes with moderate traffic, other movements involve downgrading four-lane undivided streets to three-lane streets with a turn-only center lane.

This center lane can be used by emergency vehicles like police cars, ambulance, and fire trucks to avoid traffic traveling in either direction. Drivers are not allowed to use the center lane of such a highway for passing slow-moving vehicles, except when funding or space constraints dictate use of it as a rush hour "travel lane" when traffic is largely asymmetric between a central business district and its suburbs. U.S. Route 13 near the Greenville, North Carolina, city limits is a rare instance of a posted warning sign that states "do not pass in center lane".

== Examples ==
=== No (or minimal) lane controls ===
==== Philippines ====
- A. Imao Street in Aseana City, Parañaque.
- N. Abueva Street in Aseana City, Parañaque.

==== Spain ====
- Calle Campos de Castilla in Segovia.
- Puente de la Señorita in Seville (Bus-HOV lane).

==== United States ====
- Connecticut Avenue in Washington, D.C.
- Chain Bridge in Washington, D.C.

=== Lane controls and no (or minimal) physical separation ===
==== Trans-national ====
- Peace Bridge between the U.S. and Canada, connecting Fort Erie, Ontario to Buffalo, New York. Three lanes total, all marked reversible, one reversed in the direction of rush hour flow with the possibility of all lanes flowing in the same direction based on traffic needs.
- Lewiston-Queenston Bridge connecting Niagara-on-the-Lake, Ontario to Lewiston, New York. Five lanes total, all marked as reversible, one to four lanes marked daily in the same direction, depending on traffic needs. In addition to the directional signals, special signals are also fitted to specify what type of vehicle may use the lane.

==== Australia ====
- Sydney Harbour Bridge, (eight lanes total, three (formerly four) potentially reversible, three reversed daily. Morning peak: five south, three north. Afternoon peak: three south, five north. Other times: four south, four north).
- Spit Bridge, (four lanes total. Morning peak three south, one north. Afternoon peak three north, one south. All other times two north, two south).
- General Holmes Drive generally has four north and four south lanes, but during morning peak hour one southbound lane is divided from the others with a plastic island with signs placed along the top. The island is shifted across with a specialized vehicle. This lane is used as a northbound lane for local traffic to get to Botany and Mascot from the St George area.
- Victoria Road, between the suburbs of Drummoyne and Rozelle – enables a tidal flow arrangement that provides four city bound lanes (including a dedicated bus lane) and two west bound lanes in the morning peak, before reverting to three lanes in each direction at 10am. A barrier transfer machine is used to move the concrete barrier.
- Johnston Street, Melbourne. Five lanes total, with the centre lane reversible.
- Queen's Road, Melbourne. Five lanes total, with the centre lane reversible.
- Tasman Bridge, Hobart. Five lanes total, with center lane reversible. Morning peak, three west, two east. Other times, two west, three east.

==== Bermuda ====
- East BroadWay between Front Street and Crow Lane, main routes in to Hamilton (three lanes total, one reversible).

==== Brazil ====
- Radial Leste in São Paulo has about ten lanes total (five in each direction) in most sections (but it varies slightly in others), and on weekdays it has one lane (sometimes two lanes, depending on traffic conditions) reversed during the rush hour (in the morning and in the evening) to reduce traffic congestion. In the morning, the eastbound lanes are reversed to the west (downtown), and in the evening, the westbound lanes are reversed to the east (suburb).
- Avenida Roberto Silveira in Niterói is an arterial road with four one-way lanes running southeast-to-northwest, one of which is reversible as far as Rua Domingues de Sá during evening rush hour.

==== Canada ====
British Columbia

- Lions' Gate Bridge in Vancouver (3 lanes total, 1 reversible)
- George Massey Tunnel in Delta and Richmond, B.C. (4 lanes total, 2 reversible, with access controlled by gates)
- During the 2010 Winter Olympics, British Columbia Highway 99 was subject to lane control in three-lane sections of the highway, via signs on the side of the road that were changed manually.
- Old Pitt River Bridge in Port Coquitlam and Pitt Meadows, (4 lanes total with 2 reversible lanes accessed by gates.)
- Alex Fraser Bridge in Greater Vancouver, (7 lanes total, 1 reversible with movable barrier)

Nova Scotia

- Angus L. Macdonald Bridge, Chebucto Road and the Herring Cove Road in Halifax (3 lanes total, 1 reversible)

Ontario

- Jarvis Street in downtown Toronto (5 lanes total, centre lane reversed daily for AM/PM rush hours)
- Champlain Bridge in Ottawa (3 lanes total; 1 reversible)
- Sherman Access and Sherman Cut in Hamilton, Ontario (2 lanes, both reversible)

Alberta

- Connors Road in Edmonton (3 lanes, 1 reversible)
- McDougall Hill in Edmonton
- 127th Street from 132 Avenue to Yellowhead Trail
- 97th Street from 118th Avenue to 127th Avenue in Edmonton (7 lanes total, 3 reversible)
- Centre Street from 20th Avenue N to 6th Avenue S in Calgary (4 lanes total, 2 reversible; standard configuration is 2 out, 2 in; morning rush is 1 out, 3 in; and evening rush is 3 out, 1 in)
- 10th Street NW / 9th Street SW from 5th Avenue NW to 4th Avenue SW in Calgary (4 lanes total, 2 reversible; standard configuration is 2 out, 2 in; morning rush is 1 out, 3 in; and evening rush is 3 out, 1 in)

Quebec

- Park Avenue in Montreal, five lanes total, centremost lane is reversible, sidemost lanes are reserved for public transport during rush hour; morning rush is 2 in, one out (not including bus lanes), evening rush is reversed
- Quebec Bridge in Quebec City, three lanes total with the median lane reversed for traffic heading into the city in the morning and leaving the city in the afternoon
- Jacques Cartier Bridge in Montreal, five lanes total, two for both directions, one rush hour central reversible lane
- Victoria Bridge in Montreal, two lane, one in each direction. Both lanes are inbound from 6am to 9am, and outbound from 3pm to 7.15pm.

==== Croatia ====
- State Route 102 near Kraljevica leading southbound to the Krk Bridge used to have a three-lane passing lane combination, blind curves, and a steep grade. It was later changed to a passing lane combination that makes the northbound traffic dominant.
- Motorway A6 used to have 2+1 setup at section between exit 6 Oštrovica and exit 7 Kikovica in period between its opening in 1972 and 2008, when it was upgraded to full motorway standard. Road had two lanes in direction east, and one lane in direction west, but along almost whole route overtaking was allowed in direction west so middle lane was used by both directions.

==== Germany ====
- Heerstraße, Berlin, 5 lanes in total
- Connection road between Europa Park, Rust, and the Autobahn A5, 3 lanes in total.

==== New Zealand ====
- Auckland Harbour Bridge (8 lanes total, 2 reversible, with a movable barrier)
- Panmure Bridge in Auckland (3 lanes total)
- Whangaparaoa Road; between Hibiscus Coast Highway and Red Beach Road in Auckland (3 lanes total)
- Redoubt Road; between Auckland Southern Motorway off-ramp and Hollyford Drive in Manukau (3 lanes total)

==== Spain ====
- The Paseo de Extremadura avenue in Madrid contains a reversible lane in the middle right of the six total lanes, indicated by variable lane signs.

==== Turkey ====
- Reversible lanes are frequently used in hilly sections of highways with heavy truck traffic. Most of them were built during the 1980s and 1990s.

==== United Kingdom ====
- A12/A47 road in Lowestoft on the approaches to the Bascule Bridge. As 4 lanes merge into 3 on the approaches to the bridge for both sides, the middle lane is open northbound in the morning until 11:30AM and open southbound after 11:30AM. All lanes are closed temporarily when the bridge is raised by way of red X's and red flashing lights.
- A38 road across the Tamar Bridge and through the Saltash Tunnel in Saltash. The middle lane is reversible, allowing for control of traffic flows in holiday periods and during rush hour.
- A470 North Road in Cardiff, A section of around 1 mile long between the Maindy Road Junction and College Avenue where the road drops from a dual two-lane to a three-lane section. One lane is always dedicated to Northbound (out of town) traffic, and one lane to Southbound (city centre bound traffic) with the centre lane reversing depending on the time of day – i.e. in the morning 2 lanes into the city, 1 lane out, in the evening 2 lanes out of the city, 1 lane in.
- A1434 in Lincoln (Canwick Road) has a short three-lane section of tidal flow.
- A38(M) Aston Expressway in Birmingham has 7 lanes, 3 of which are flexible according to rush hour traffic flow direction/time of day.

==== United States ====
Alabama

- In Montgomery, Norman Bridge Road through the Garden District and Old Cloverdale has a center lane with reversible markings and traffic flow lights between Burton Avenue and Legrand Place.

Alaska

- The Anton Anderson Memorial Tunnel between Portage and Whittier is a 13,300 feet (4,050 m) long, reversible single lane tunnel, shared between vehicular traffic and trains. The direction of traffic alternates every 15 minutes, with periods allowed for train traffic each day.

Arizona

- In Phoenix on 7th Avenue between McDowell Road and Northern Avenue, and 7th Street between McDowell Road and Cave Creek Road/Dunlap Avenue. On both roads, the lane configuration is 2 southbound and 3 northbound, with the center lane open for southbound traffic between 6-9am and open to northbound traffic between 4-6pm. Left turns are prohibited from the reversible lane at most arterial and collector street intersections during these hours but still allowed at driveways and non-signaled street intersections.

California

- Lafayette Street in Santa Clara – the center lane is used for northbound traffic on weekday mornings, southbound traffic for weekday afternoons, and as a center turning lane at other times.
- Golden Gate Bridge in San Francisco and Marin County – (6 lanes total, 2 reversible with moveable barriers)
- 4th Street Bridge in Los Angeles – the center lane is used for westbound traffic on weekday mornings, eastbound traffic for weekday afternoons, and as a center turning lane at other times.
- The San Diego-Coronado Bay Bridge (a portion of SR 75) – five lanes with movable center wall; is alternately configured as 3/2 or 2/3 dependent on time of day (westbound mornings, eastbound afternoons)
- Interstate 15 "Express Lanes" in San Diego County between SR 52 and SR 78 – four lanes with movable barrier; normally configured as 2/2 but can be shifted to 3/1 or 1/3 if needed

District of Columbia

- Rock Creek Parkway operates as a one-way road on weekday mornings and afternoons.
- Clara Barton Parkway operates as a one-way road between the MacArthur Boulevard Exit and Chain Bridge on weekday mornings and afternoons
- Independence Avenue has a reversible center lane on weekday mornings and afternoons between 3rd Street SW and 2nd Street SE.

Florida

- Bay Street in Jacksonville
- NW 199th Street in Miami between NW 27th Avenue and NW 2nd Avenue there are two lanes always dedicated to Eastbound and Westbound, west of Florida's Turnpike there are two reversible lanes, and west of the turnpike, there is one reversible lane.
- The replacement of the Toms Bayou Bridge in Valparaiso utilized reversible lanes during construction in 2018.

Georgia

- South Atlanta Street (SR 9) in Roswell: the center lane of three is reversed using overhead lane-use control signals between Marietta Highway (SR 120) and the Chattahoochee River.
- Vineville Avenue (US 41/SR 19) in Macon: the center lane of three is reversed using overhead lane-use control signals.
- (Formerly) Northside Drive (US 41/SR 3) in Atlanta: Until 2009, the center lane of three between Arden Road NW and Interstate 75 was reversed using overhead lane-use control signals. This reversible travel lane was removed in multiple phases between 2009 and 2014 and replaced with a two-way left turn lane.
- (Formerly) Memorial Drive (SR 154) in Atlanta: Until 2019, between Pearl Street SE and Whiteford Avenue SE, the center lane of three was reversed using overhead lane-use control signals. This reversible travel lane was replaced with a two-way left turn lane.
- (Formerly) Dekalb Avenue NE/Decatur Street NE in Atlanta: Until 2023, alongside the blue and green Metropolitan Atlanta Rapid Transit Authority line, the center lane of three was reversed using overhead lane-use control signals according to rush hour traffic. This reversible travel lane was replaced with a two-way left turn lane.

Indiana

- In Indianapolis, Fall Creek Parkway North Drive between Central Avenue and Evanston Avenue has 5 lanes (7 in some sections) with 1 lane marked as reversible. Configuration is typically designed to allow for 3 in, 2 out during morning rush hours, and 2 in, 3 out during afternoon rush hours. Due to Fall Creek Parkway's proximity to the Indiana State Fairgrounds, lane configurations change periodically to facilitate traffic flow during events at the fairgrounds.

Kentucky

- Clay Wade Bailey Bridge in Covington (3 lanes total, 1 reversible)
- Nicholasville Road (US 27) in Lexington has reversible lanes (lane signals, no physical separation) starting at its intersection with Conn Terrace at the University of Kentucky campus and ending at New Circle Road, the city's inner beltway. During morning rush hour, as well as the hours before UK football home games, southbound traffic (away from the UK campus and downtown) is restricted to one lane between campus and Southland Drive, and two lanes from Southland to New Circle. Northbound traffic faces the same restrictions in the evening rush hour and immediately after football games. During off-peak hours, an equal number of lanes are dedicated to traffic in each direction. One dedicated left-turn lane is always provided regardless of the current traffic configuration.
- Baxter Avenue and Bardstown Road (US 31E) in Louisville have reversible lanes (lane signals without any physical separation) for 2 1/2 miles through The Highlands, starting at their intersection with Lexington Road in the north and ending at Douglass Boulevard in the south. This stretch of road has four lanes, but on-street parking frequently restricts traffic to one lane in each direction outside of rush hours. During rush hours, parking is prohibited north of Douglass Boulevard. Southbound traffic leaving downtown Louisville is restricted to one lane during the morning rush hour, with northbound traffic having the same restriction during the evening rush hour. Also, the lane immediately to the left of rush-hour through traffic becomes a dedicated left-turn lane. Electronic signs over the roadway alert motorists to the traffic flow dedication of each lane. According to a 2017 traffic study, this is the only road in the United States that has both lane lights and on-street parking. In 2018, a proposed called for ending this traffic arrangement.

Maryland

- Chesapeake Bay Bridge (a portion of US 50) near Annapolis (5 lanes total, all marked reversible, 1 usually reversed for normal peak traffic). However, due to its dual spans, when there are 2 eastbound lanes and 3 westbound the opposing sides are completely divided, this is the usual configuration.
- Hanover Street Bridge in Baltimore has 5 lanes total marked reversible, with 1 usually reversed for normal peak traffic).
- Georgia Avenue in Silver Spring has 7 lanes. During most hours, the center lane is marked with a yellow lit X as a left turn lane for both directions. During morning and evening rush hours, the lane is marked with a down facing green arrow – southbound in the morning, northbound in the evening – or a red X – northbound in the morning, southbound in the evening – and left turns are prohibited.
- Colesville Road (US 29) in Silver Spring has 6 lanes. During off-rush hours, three lanes go in each direction. During morning rush hours, four lanes (marked with green arrows) go southbound, while northbound (marked with Xs in those lanes) is relegated to two lanes. During afternoon rush, the process is reversed.
- Clara Barton Parkway operates as a one-way road between the MacArthur Boulevard Exit and Chain Bridge on weekday mornings and afternoons
- Gay Street in Baltimore between North Avenue and Preston Street has 3 lanes. The middle lane is reversible with northbound/outbound traffic using the lane in the afternoon and southbound/inbound traffic using the lane in the morning.

Michigan

- Mackinac Bridge (a portion of I-75) near St Ignace treats the passing lane of the southbound side as a temporary northbound lane during the Labor Day bridge walk, at which time the northbound side is used for pedestrians.
- Like 7th Street and 7th Avenue in Phoenix, at one time Michigan Avenue in Dearborn had a reversible lane between Telegraph Road (US 24) and the Southfield Freeway which was marked with lane signals. These have since been removed.

Nebraska

- Dodge Street (US 6) between Turner Boulevard and 68th Street in Omaha: no physical separation; lanes marked with overhead lane-use control signals. Center lane direction is eastbound from 5:50am–9:00am and westbound from 9:00am–5:50am.
- Farnam Street between Saddle Creek Road and 57th Street in Omaha: no physical separation; lanes marked with lane-use control signals and LED signs. On weekdays the direction is one-way eastbound 7am-9am, and one-way westbound 4pm-6pm.

New Jersey

- Lincoln Tunnel's center tube (one of three in total) is reversible. In general, both of the lanes, including one "XBL" (Exclusive Bus Lane), serve Manhattan-bound traffic during the weekday morning rush hour, both of the lanes serve New Jersey-bound traffic during the weekday evening rush hour, and one lane is provided in each direction during other time periods.
- Since 1970, the Lincoln Tunnel Approach and Helix in Hudson County supports an "XBL", or Exclusive Bus Lane, on Route 495 during the weekday morning peak period (approximately 6:00 a.m. – 10:00 a.m.). Eastbound buses travel in this reversible lane to the approach to the toll plaza at the Lincoln Tunnel, at the other end of which is the Port Authority Bus Terminal in Midtown Manhattan in New York City. The lane is fed by the New Jersey Turnpike at Exits 16E and 17, and the western terminus of Route 3. Both the tunnel and terminal are owned and operated by the Port Authority of New York and New Jersey, the bi-state agency that also operates the 2.5-mile (4.02 km) reversible, express bus lane along the left lane of three westbound lanes. The XBL serves over 1,800 buses, which transport more than 65,000 persons, each morning and is a major component of the morning "inbound" commutation crossing the Hudson River. Over 100 bus carriers utilize the Exclusive Bus Lane. New Jersey Transit operates numerous interstate bus routes through the Lincoln Tunnel, as do numerous regional and long-distance companies.
- Walt Whitman Bridge, Ben Franklin Bridge and Commodore Barry Bridge over the Delaware River between New Jersey and Pennsylvania use moveable medians, to create zipper lanes.

New York

- Upper level of the Queensboro Bridge in New York City has four lanes and can have all flowing inbound (AM peak), or two lanes each direction in normal configuration.
- Mid-Hudson Bridge in Poughkeepsie, New York, has a reversible center lane used during rush hour.

North Carolina

- (Formerly) East 7th Street in Charlotte
- US 29 in Charlotte
  - This road is the access road to Charlotte Motor Speedway from the city, and links to Interstate 485. It is used for any events at the speedway.
- Edwards Mill Road in Raleigh near Lenovo Center.

Ohio

- (Formerly) Butler Street in Sandusky, used to route traffic between US 250 and Cleveland Road, featured a reversible center lane to facilitate influxes of traffic going to and from Cedar Point.

Pennsylvania

- Liberty Bridge near the southern terminus of I-579 in Pittsburgh has 4 lanes, all of which are potentially reversible, and 2 of which are reversed based on rush-hour times.
- West End Bridge in Pittsburgh has 4 lanes, which are all potentially reversible.
- West General Robinson Street near Acrisure Stadium in Pittsburgh has 4 lanes, and 2 are reversible.

South Carolina

- The Silas N. Pearman Bridge, demolished in 2005, originally contained a third reversible lane, leftmost when heading north on US 17. This was converted to a fixed truck lane for southbound traffic shortly after its construction in the 1960s, as an inspection of its companion bridge, the John P. Grace Memorial Bridge, revealed it was no longer strong enough to carry truck traffic. Both bridges would eventually be rendered obsolete and replaced by the Ravenel Bridge.

Tennessee

- US 70 in Nashville has three reversible lanes (lane signals, Traffic Lights, without any physical separation) from Korean Veterans Boulevard to just east of a railroad crossing, there is a break in the reversible lanes between Willow Street and Lindsley Avenue.
- Victory Memorial Bridge in Nashville has 5 lanes, with only the center lane begin a reversible lanes (lane signals without any physical separation).

Texas

- West Alabama Street and North Main Street in Houston – both are three-lane streets, which operate in a 2 in, 1 out configuration during the morning rush, a 1 in, 2 out configuration during the evening rush, and a 1 each way + two-way left turn lane at other times.
- North Collins Street from Cowboys Way to East Division Street, and East Division Street from North Collins Street to Six Flags Drive, just east of SH 360 are reversible to give access to Cowboys Stadium in Arlington

Utah

- 5400 South (SR-173) in Salt Lake County between 1900 West and Bangerter Highway has seven lanes, three of which are reversible and include a center turning lane at all times.

Virginia

- River Road in Newport News between 75th Street and Shipyard Drive. This is the truck route for Newport News Shipbuilding.

=== Lane controls and physical separation ===
==== Germany ====
- The Elbe Tunnel near Hamburg, Germany, is part of the Bundesautobahn A7 and has four separate bores, of which two can be switched to allow travel either in each direction or unidirectionally.

==== Spain ====
- The Centenario Bridge on the SE-30 ring-road in Seville has a reversible lane in the middle of its five total lanes. However, this lane will soon disappear due to ongoing works to widen the bridge's lanes.

==== United Kingdom ====
- The A38(M) motorway (also known as the Aston Expressway) in Birmingham, England. The road connects the city centre with Spaghetti Junction on the M6. It is a 2-mile, 7-lane section of motorway with no central reservation, and a lower than usual speed limit of 50 mph. Constructed in 1971, it was the United Kingdom's first contraflow road. Overhead lane control signals allow for 4 lanes in and 2 out in the morning rush hour, reversed in the evening, and 3 lanes each way at all other times. One dividing lane is closed to traffic at all times, and motorcycles are permanently prohibited from using the central, red-surfaced lane (with a fixed sign) owing to its use as an off-camber drain. The lane control signals can be set to allow travel in either direction for any lane in exceptional circumstances, which has been used for single-lane, reduced-speed running in each direction (or 2+1 with no divider) during road work, allowing the expressway to remain largely open even during major repairs. However, the 7-lane section splits at both ends to fully divided sets of 4x2 lane slip roads, with the central red lane ending in a barrier, so full use of this flexibility is uncommon and occasional overnight closure is required.

==== United States ====
- U.S. Route 78 in Snellville, Georgia, United States, has 6 lanes in total. This occurs from the limited access portion through Stone Mountain Park to Georgia State Route 124 (Scenic Highway) for several miles. The middle two lanes were reversible (usually occurring during rush hour) with a varying lane always reserved as a center turn lane; hence 3 lanes were used for one direction of travel and 2 for the other. However, due to rising traffic volumes during peak hours that made traffic flows equivalent, the reversible lane system was removed in 2009.
- The Caldecott Tunnel between Oakland, California and Contra Costa County, previously had three separate bores, with the middle bore switching direction twice daily for rush hour traffic. A fourth tunnel bore opened in November 2013 to westbound traffic. Two bores are now permanently used by westbound traffic, and the other two by eastbound traffic, with no reversible lanes.

=== Lane controls and physical separation by movable barrier ===
==== Canada ====
- Alex Fraser Bridge in Vancouver, British Columbia (7 lanes total, 1 reversible)

==== New Zealand ====
- Auckland Harbour Bridge in Auckland, New Zealand

==== United States ====
The Golden Gate Bridge moveable barrier, installed January 2015

- Benjamin Franklin Bridge, Walt Whitman Bridge, and Commodore Barry Bridge in Philadelphia
- Tappan Zee Bridge (1955) in New York
- Theodore Roosevelt Bridge in Washington, D.C.
- San Diego-Coronado Bay Bridge in San Diego, California (part of California Route 75)
- Southeast Expressway in and near Boston, Massachusetts
- A reversible lane, also called a zipper lane, is in use on eastbound Interstate H-1 for traffic heading from Leeward Oahu to Pearl Harbor. It is open from 5:30 to 9:00 a.m.
- The Golden Gate Bridge (6 lanes total, 2 reversible), connecting San Francisco with suburban Marin County. Prior to 2015, opposing traffic lanes were separated only by plastic pylons, which were moved several times daily by hand and provided minimal physical separation. Installation of a movable median barrier was completed on January 11, 2015.
- Verrazzano–Narrows Bridge in New York City (7 lanes total, 1 reversible)

=== Third (reversible) carriageways on freeways ===
==== Australia ====
- Warringah Expressway in Sydney, Australia

==== Germany ====
- Bundesautobahn 7, New Elbe Tunnel, Hamburg, Germany (actually two reversible carriageways, plus two fixed)

==== Netherlands ====
- A1 motorway between the interchanges of A9 and A6, Amsterdam, Netherlands. A two lane carriage is opened in the peak direction during rush hours.
- A10 motorway, Second Coen Tunnel, Amsterdam, Netherlands. One of the tubes is opened in the peak direction during rush hours.

==== United States ====
- Interstate 5 in Seattle, Washington
- Interstate 15 in northern San Diego, California
- Interstate 17 in Arizona, between Black Canyon City and Sunset Point, north of Phoenix
- Interstate 25 and US-36 in Denver, Colorado
- Interstate 394 through Minneapolis, Minnesota and its western suburbs
- Interstate 90/Interstate 94 (segment of the Kennedy Expressway) in Chicago, Illinois
- Interstate 75 and Interstate 575 north of Atlanta, Georgia, and Interstate 75 south of Atlanta
- Interstate 279 in Pittsburgh, Pennsylvania (center carriageway reserved for HOV traffic during rush hour)
- Lee Roy Selmon Expressway from Brandon to Tampa, Florida
- Interstate 595 between Interstate 75 and Interstate 95, through the western suburbs of Fort Lauderdale, Florida, contains a fully reversible, variable-toll carriageway for express lanes. Travel direction is eastbound during morning rush hour and most of the rest of the day, and westbound during afternoon rush hour and most of the rest of the evening.
- Interstate 64 in Norfolk, Virginia (24/7 High Occupancy Toll Lane system, free for HOV-2+ traffic with E-ZPass Flex)
- Interstate 395 and Interstate 95 in the Virginia suburbs of Washington, D.C. (24/7 High Occupancy Toll Lane system, free for HOV-3+ traffic with E-ZPass Flex)
- Lincoln Tunnel between Weehawken, New Jersey and the New York City borough of Manhattan has three tubes with two lanes each. The center tube carries two lanes in peak direction weekdays (with a reserved inbound bus lane during the AM rush period) and a single lane each direction off-peak (nights, weekends, holidays).
- Multiple freeways in Houston have reversible center HOV lanes operated by Houston METRO.

=== Entire roadway routinely reversed ===
==== Brazil ====
- The Anchieta/Imigrantes highway system in Brazil contains the world's longest fully reversible road (The Imigrantes variant at a length of 58.5 km). It comprises a total of ten lanes distributed over four separate roadways (3+3+2+2), each of which can be reversed. Traffic flow is unidirectional on up to three roadways at a time, in different combinations, depending on demand. Since this highway system is the only quick route from São Paulo to the beach, the majority of the traffic on Fridays and Sundays are cars on weekend trips, creating highly asymmetrical demand.

==== Canada ====
- Sherman Access and Sherman Cut in Hamilton, Ontario. Two lanes total, both marked as reversible, with both lanes flowing in the same direction during rush hour each weekday.
- Victoria Bridge, in Montreal, Quebec, normally allows for two-way traffic. But during rush hours, it only allows one-way traffic, northbound in the morning, and southbound in the afternoon.

==== Germany ====
- Sierichstraße in Hamburg, Germany, a fully reversible, two-lane city street.

==== Hong Kong ====
- In Hong Kong, most vehicular tunnels are dual tube. In the early hours one of the tubes will be closed, and one of the lanes in the other tube carries reversed traffic.

==== Sudan ====
- The White Nile Bridge connecting Khartoum and Omdurman in Sudan, with four lanes total. Traffic is generally directed equally, two lanes to Khartoum and two lanes from except in the morning, where it is three lanes towards Khartoum, and in the evening, three lanes towards Omdurman.

==== United States ====
- In Washington, D.C., the Rock Creek and Potomac Parkway between the Lincoln Memorial and Calvert St. is converted from two lanes in each direction to one-way southbound in the morning and one-way northbound in the evening rush hour Monday through Friday, excluding federal holidays. The P Street exit, usually unavailable northbound, is an allowed left exit in the evening. South of Virginia Avenue, two lanes are closed during rush hours to facilitate the merge to or from Virginia Avenue. There are no overhead markings, but police barricades block wrong-way entrances to the roadway.
- Canal Road in Washington, D.C. (between Foxhall Road and Arizona Avenue)
- Assembly Street and Bluff Road (both part of South Carolina 48), along with Shop Road and George Rogers Boulevard in Columbia, South Carolina, are one-way during University of South Carolina football games at Williams-Brice Stadium.
- The lower deck of the Centre Street Bridge in Calgary, Alberta, is fully reversible. It normally allows for two-way traffic, but both lanes flow in the same direction during rush hour each day.
- Farnam Street in Omaha is a normally two-way, two-lane street that during rush hour becomes one-way eastbound in the morning and westbound in the evening.
- The Baker–Barry Tunnel, one of only two means of access to the Marin Headlands from U.S. Route 101 in Marin County, California, is not wide enough to accommodate bidirectional traffic. It consists of a single reversible lane for automobiles and two bicycle lanes. The direction of automobile traffic alternates every five minutes, controlled by a traffic light at each end of the tunnel. The bicycle lanes, one for each direction, are located on either side of the reversible lane; buttons on either side of the tunnel trigger flashing signs alerting drivers entering the tunnel to the presence of cyclists.

=== Entire roadway formerly reversed ===
==== Australia ====
- The Southern Expressway in Adelaide, South Australia, was the world's longest exclusively one-way reversible road. It opened in 1997 and eventually traversed 21 kilometres (13 mi) though the city's southern suburbs, until its duplication to carry two-way traffic completed in 2014. It changed direction to carry peak hour traffic to the city centre in the morning and away from the city in the evening. On weekends, the directions were reversed.

=== One lane formerly reversed ===
==== Australia ====
- Alfords Point Bridge in Australia from 1973 till bridge duplication in 2008. The center lane was reversible. After 2008, a 300-metre reversible center lane still remained on Alfords Point Road over Henry Lawson Drive, approximately 500 meters north of this duplicated bridge.
- Washington Boulevard (SR 237) in Arlington County, Virginia, United States between 13th Street and Wilson Boulevard – this one-block section had only 3 lanes with the center lane reversible by overhead light up indicators. Since 2024, it has been widened to four lanes (two in each direction).

==== Hungary ====
- Motorway M7 in Hungary from 1972 until the completion of the second carriageway in 1975. The existing carriageway between Törökbálint and Zamárdi normally operated with one lane in each direction, but carried traffic towards Budapest only on Sunday afternoons.

== Escalators ==
In shopping centres and metro stations there may be an odd number of escalators, with one or more escalators running in different directions in different time of a day.

== See also ==
- Contraflow lane
- Contraflow lane reversal
- Single-track road
- Stop-gap
