= Queensborough, New Westminster =

Neighbourhood in British Columbia, Canada

Queensborough Koonspa
- Neighbourhood of New Westminster
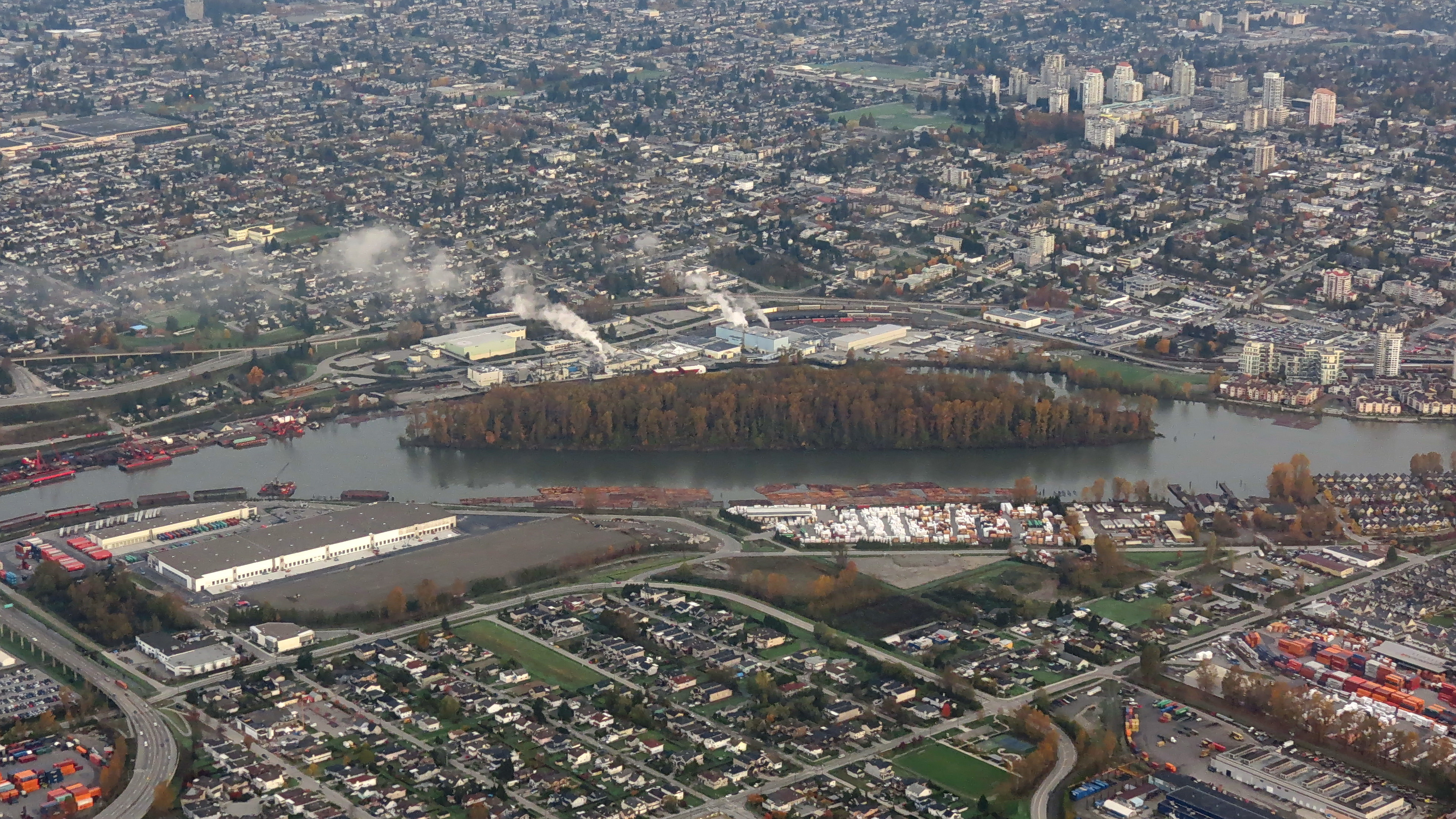
- Queensborough in foreground

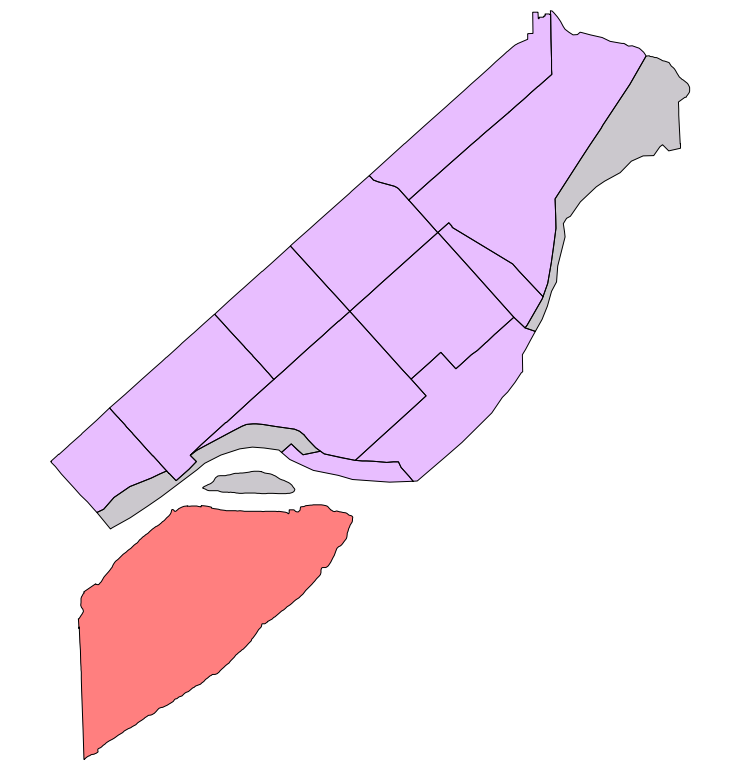
- Location of Queensborough shown in red

- Location of Queensborough within Metro Vancouver
- Coordinates: 49°11′00″N 122°56′00″W
- Country: Canada
- Province: British Columbia
- Region: Lower Mainland
- Regional District: Metro Vancouver
- City: New Westminster
- Incorporated: 1911

Government
  - Mayor: Patrick Johnstone
  - MP (Fed.): Jake Sawatzky (Liberal Party of Canada)
  - MLA (Prov.): Steve Kooner (BC Conservative)

Population (2021)
  - Total: 10,983
- Time zone: UTC−8 (PST)
  - Summer (DST): UTC−7 (PDT)

Queensborough is a neighbourhood in the city of New Westminster, British Columbia, Canada. It is on the eastern tip of Lulu Island on the Fraser River.

At the north end of Queensborough is a new development called Port Royal. To the south is Thompson's Landing, to the west is the industrial area of Tree Island, and to the east is the Fraser River. Access to Annacis Island, an industrial park area and site of one of the GVRD's sewage plants, is via a bridge towards the east end of Queensborough, though the island itself is not part of the City of New Westminster.

== History ==
Queensborough was the name originally chosen for the colonial capital by Royal Engineers Commander Colonel Richard Clement Moody. Queen Victoria designated New Westminster instead of Queensborough as her new capital's name. In the 1860s, a survey of Lulu Island by the Royal Engineers resulted in the eastern tip of the island being designated a military reserve for the defense of New Westminster. This portion of land was not incorporated into the new Township of Richmond in 1879. Instead the rapidly growing City of New Westminster annexed the area in 1889. The City received title to the entire Military Reserve from the Provincial Government and it decided to subdivide the area for sale in 1890. A bridge was constructed to reach the area from the Mainland and the lands sold at auction.

The name Queensborough for this neighbourhood of the City was formally established in 1911 when the Queensborough Post Office was opened by early community leader and Italian immigrant Anthony Sprice. In the Chinook Jargon, it is said that an adaption of the name Queensborough – "Koonspa" – is the usual name for New Westminster as a whole.

With its many lumber mills and canneries the area became a focus of new immigrants looking for employment and cheap lots to establish family homes. These early groups built their own cultural halls, churches and had many different mutual aid societies. However, the entire community united at time under the Queensborough Ratepayers Association founded in 1911. This group continues to operate and is often cited as the oldest ratepayers association in British Columbia. Early immigrants came from Asia and Europe; including the Japanese, Chinese, Indians, Italians, Greeks, Slovaks, Ukrainians, and Finns. The community grew slowly but developed a unique sense of place because of its unique cultural composition.

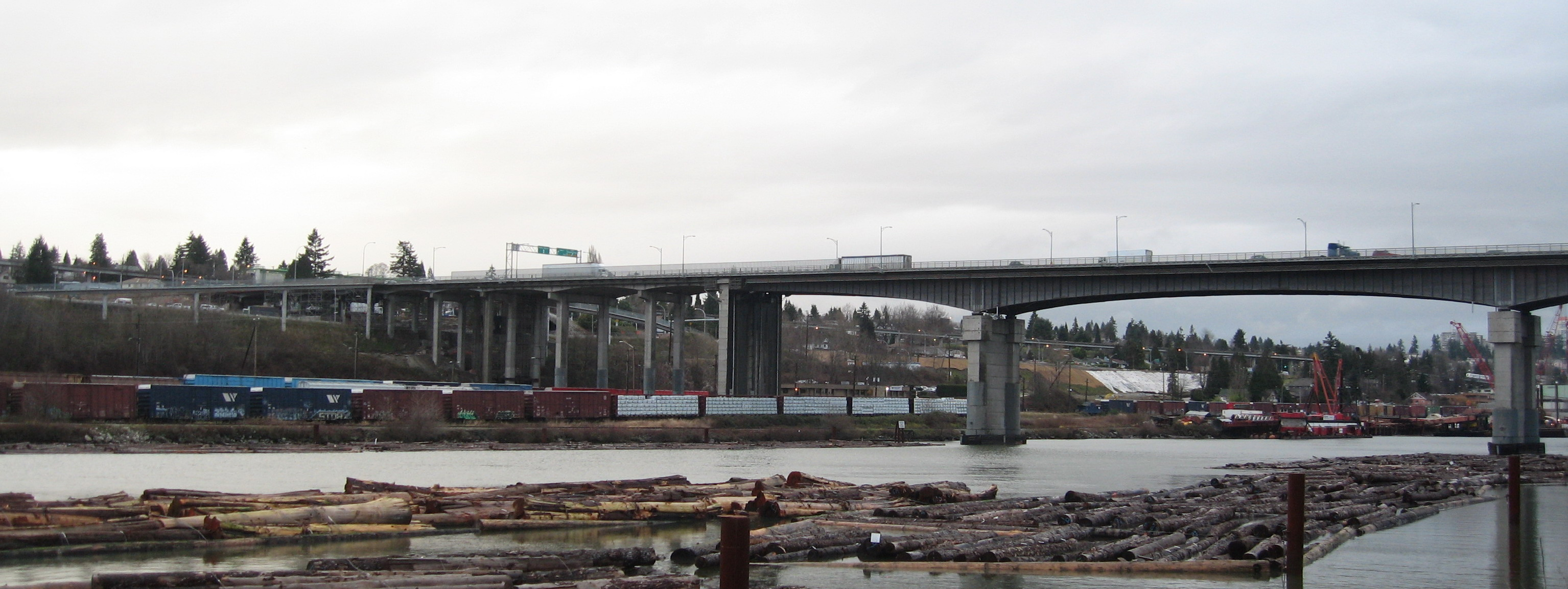
Queensborough Bridge

Queensborough is today a growing suburban district with a rapidly redeveloped waterfront area known as Port Royal. Queensborough is connected to the rest of New Westminster by the Queensborough Bridge and Annacis Island in Delta by the Derwent Way Bridge. Furthermore, the city of New Westminster has also implemented a ferry service that takes city inhabitants and tourists from Port Royal in Queensborough to the Westminster Quay. It is served by Highway 91A. Many new homes in the area are built to resemble old heritage-style homes.

In the heart of Queensborough is Ryall Park. This is also where Queensborough Community Centre is located. The park has several features which include playgrounds, a spray park and Boro All Wheel Park (a skatepark and a bike park). Renovations are currently under way converting Ryall's bike park section of Boro All Wheel Park into an off-leash park for dogs. This park will be split and will have designated areas for small dogs, and all other dogs. Queensborough Middle School and Queen Elizabeth Elementary School are also located in the same park-block.

In 2004 a shopping centre called Queensborough Landing was built.

== Demographics ==
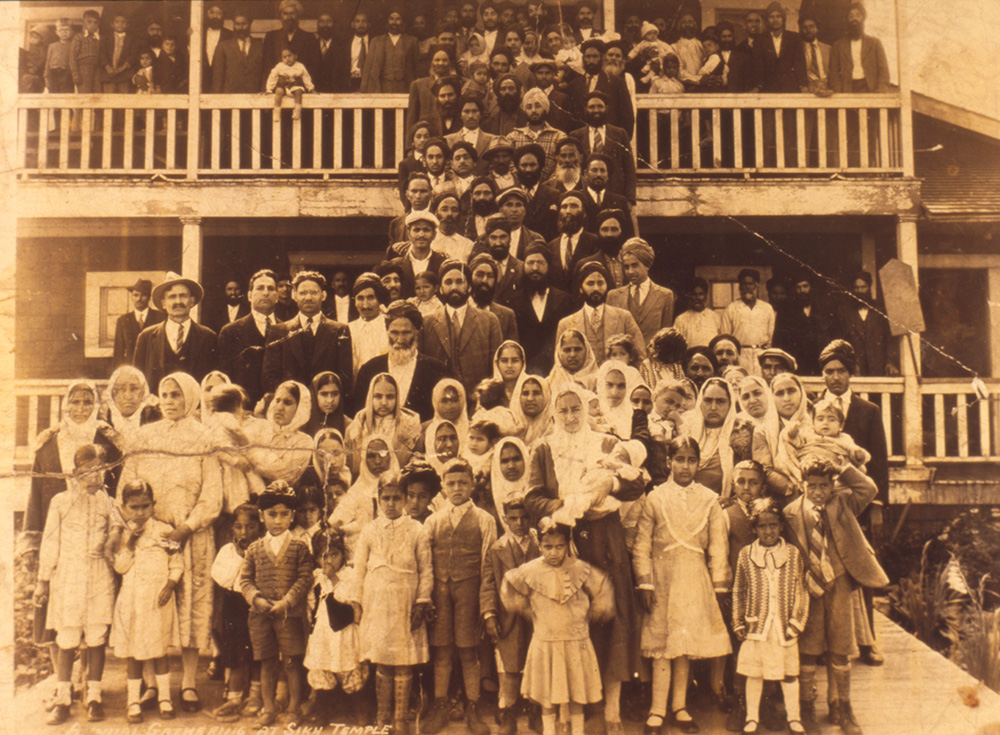
Queensborough Sikh temple, 1931

Population history
| Year | Pop. | ±% |
|---|---|---|
| 1991 | 1,942 | — |
| 1996 | 3,020 | +55.5% |
| 2001 | 4,553 | +50.8% |
| 2006 | 5,502 | +20.8% |
| 2011 | 7,125 | +29.5% |
| 2016 | 8,727 | +22.5% |
| 2021 | 10,983 | +25.9% |
Source: Statistics Canada

A legacy of early 20th century settlement, the neighbourhood has a large South Asian population. In recent decades the European and East Asian population have grown with the area witnessing increasing residential development and infill. In the 1960s, there were many new European immigrants; Italians, Portuguese, Polish, Romanian and Russian. In the 1970s, Asian immigration increased; a new wave of Indian immigrants settled in the area, along with Chinese and Filipino newcomers.

Panethnic groups in Queensborough, New Westminster (1996−2021)
| Panethnic group | 2021 | | 2016 | | 2011 | | 2006 | | 2001 | | 1996 | |
| Panethnic group | Pop. | % | Pop. | % | Pop. | % | Pop. | % | Pop. | % | Pop. | % |
|---|---|---|---|---|---|---|---|---|---|---|---|---|
| South Asian | 2,990 | 27.36% | 2,370 | 27.26% | 2,600 | 36.65% | 2,080 | 37.96% | 1,940 | 42.68% | 1,120 | 36.78% |
| European (Note: Statistic includes all persons that did not make up part of a visible minority or an indigenous identity.) | 2,460 | 22.51% | 2,570 | 29.56% | 2,235 | 31.5% | 1,855 | 33.85% | 1,645 | 36.19% | 1,445 | 47.45% |
| East Asian (Note: Statistic includes total responses of "Chinese", "Korean", and "Japanese" under visible minority section on census.) | 2,080 | 19.03% | 1,620 | 18.63% | 865 | 12.19% | 595 | 10.86% | 305 | 6.71% | 135 | 4.43% |
| Southeast Asian (Note: Statistic includes total responses of "Filipino" and "Southeast Asian" under visible minority section on census.) | 2,010 | 18.39% | 1,470 | 16.91% | 915 | 12.9% | 455 | 8.3% | 175 | 3.85% | 95 | 3.12% |
| Latin American | 315 | 2.88% | 120 | 1.38% | 170 | 2.4% | 100 | 1.82% | 15 | 0.33% | 15 | 0.49% |
| Middle Eastern (Note: Statistic includes total responses of "West Asian" and "Arab" under visible minority section on census.) | 310 | 2.84% | 75 | 0.86% | 110 | 1.55% | 55 | 1% | 155 | 3.41% | 65 | 2.13% |
| African | 200 | 1.83% | 155 | 1.78% | 65 | 0.92% | 110 | 2.01% | 165 | 3.63% | 30 | 0.99% |
| Indigenous | 160 | 1.46% | 160 | 1.84% | 40 | 0.56% | 185 | 3.38% | 65 | 1.43% | 45 | 1.48% |
| Other/multiracial (Note: Statistic includes total responses of "Visible minority, n.i.e." and "Multiple visible minorities" under visible minority section on census.) | 410 | 3.75% | 160 | 1.84% | 85 | 1.2% | 40 | 0.73% | 75 | 1.65% | 95 | 3.12% |
| Total responses | 10,930 | 99.52% | 8,695 | 99.63% | 7,095 | 99.58% | 5,480 | 99.6% | 4,545 | 99.82% | 3,045 | 100.83% |
| Total population | 10,983 | 100% | 8,727 | 100% | 7,125 | 100% | 5,502 | 100% | 4,553 | 100% | 3,020 | 100% |

== Education ==
One elementary school, Queen Elizabeth Elementary School, and one middle school, Queensborough Middle School, are located in the neighbourhood.

A Library and community centre were also recently opened. The community centre has a newly renovated exercise area and a gymnasium where local residents partake in physical games.

== Flood Risk ==
Queensborough makes up two-thirds of New Westminster's floodplain area. While the Queensborough Dike is currently sufficient to protect against water levels of a present-day 1:500-year flood (equivalent to the 1894 flood of record), about 50% of the dike does not meet the provincial required minimum freeboard of 0.6m, with existing freeboard varying between 0.2m and 0.5m. This inadequate freeboard could increase the probability of a dike breach as flood waters approach the dike crest elevation. Furthermore, the Queensborough Dike Crest elevation is not sufficient for the projected 1-in-500 year flood events under 2050 and 2100 climate change scenarios.

Due to Queensborough's low-lying elevation, a present-day 1:500 year single flood event would cause approximately $300 million in building damage in this area, representing about 85% of the total flood damage to buildings in the City. This is projected to increase to $400 million under 2050 climate change scenarios. The City has identified that upgrading the Queensborough dike system would cost approximately $84.6 million, including $55.9 million for construction and $28.7 million for seismic improvements along its 6.5 km length. Economic analysis shows a strong cost-benefit ratio of 6.89 for implementing flood protection improvements in Queensborough, indicating it should be prioritized for flood protection measures.

The majority of living space in Queensborough is already built above current flood design levels of 3.5m, with the remainder potentially raised through Flood Construction Level (FCL) strategies. The annual probability of a major flood overtopping the dikes is approximately 0.7% (1 in 142 chance). Over a 70-year period, this represents a 40% chance of experiencing a major flood that would inundate approximately 20% of houses to depths up to 1.7m.

== See also ==
- Royal eponyms in Canada
