= Annacis Island =

Island in Delta, British Columbia

Coordinates: 49°10′00″N 122°56′59″W

A map of Annacis Island (red) with the rest of Delta (pink) and Metro Vancouver (green)

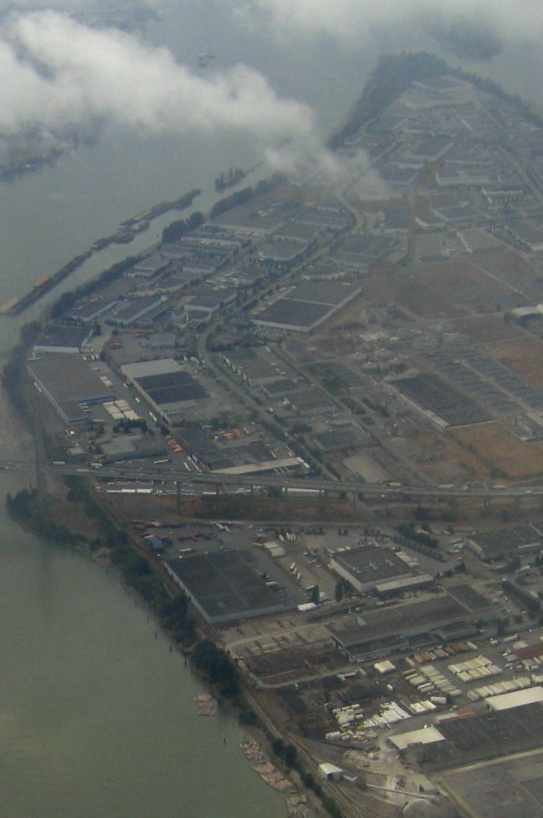
Annacis Island (South)

Annacis Island is a narrow island under the jurisdiction of City of Delta in Lower Mainland, British Columbia, located just downstream of the south arm of the Fraser River bifurcation between Lulu Island to the north and the Delta peninsula to the south. The island is now mostly an industrial zone, and contains one of Metro Vancouver's secondary wastewater treatment plants, the Annacis Island Wastewater Treatment Plant. The island is also home to the British Columbia Institute of Technology's Annacis Island campus.

The southern part of the island is connected to Delta via the Alex Fraser Bridge, which is part of Highway 91. Connections northward to Richmond and New Westminster are via smaller bridges on Highway 91. At the eastern end of the island there is also the Annacis Island Swing Bridge which connects the island to the Queensborough neighborhood of New Westminster on the eastern end of Lulu Island. Annacis Island is served by a public bus that connects to 22nd Street Station in New Westminster.

The wider part of the Fraser River south of the island is known as Annieville Channel (upstream) and City Reach (downstream), while the more narrow channel north of the island is Annacis Channel. The eastern (upstream) tip of the island is known as Shoal Point, and the western (downstream) tip as Purfleet Point.

== Origin of the name ==
The island's name is derived from "Annance's Island," named for Noel François Annance, an Abenaki and a Hudson's Bay Company clerk, who travelled with Chief Factor James McMillan to found Fort Langley in 1827.

== History ==
Once a farming and fishing island, the island opened on 1955 as Canada's first industrial park.

On August 7, 2017, a fire broke out in a warehouse on Annacis Island.
