= British Columbia Highway 91 =

Highway in British Columbia

Highway 91
- Annacis Highway; Richmond Freeway; East-West Connector
- Highway 91 highlighted in red

Route information
- Maintained by the Ministry of Transportation and Infrastructure
- Length: 23 km (14 mi)
- Existed: 1986–present

Major junctions
- South end: Highway 99 in Delta
- Highway 10 in Delta; Highway 17 in Delta (via Hwy 91C); Highway 91A in Richmond; Knight Street in Richmond
- West end: Highway 99/Alderbridge Way in Richmond

Location
- Country: Canada
- Province: British Columbia
- Major cities: Richmond, Delta

Highway system
- British Columbia provincial highways
| ← Highway 77 | → Highway 91A |

Highway 91 is an alternative freeway route to Highway 99 through Delta, New Westminster and Richmond, British Columbia. The highway was built in two sections, the first section from Delta to East Richmond in 1986, and the second section across Richmond in 1989.

It was the highest numbered highway in British Columbia that is not derived from a continuation of a US highway, until the designation of Highway 118 in 2003.

== Route description ==
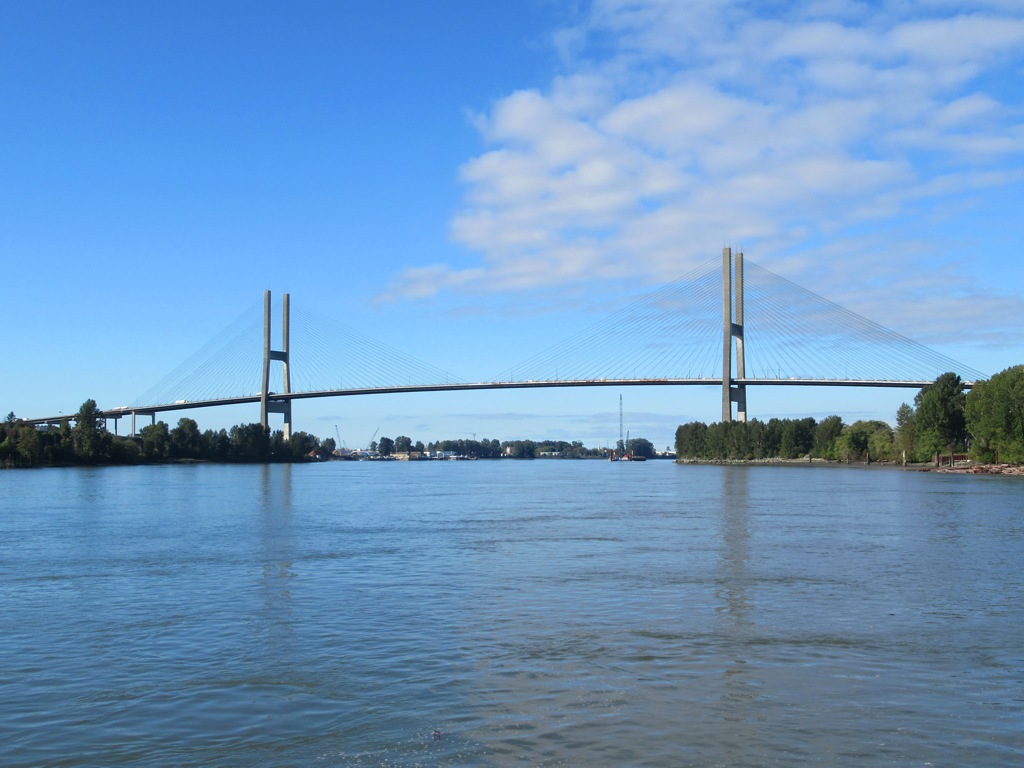
Alex Fraser Bridge carries Highway 91 over the Fraser River

The total distance covered by Highway 91 is 22 km (14 mi). Starting at its junction with Highway 99 in East Delta, the route travels north for 2 km (1¼ mi) to a junction with Highway 10, then north for 10 km (6 mi) through three interchanges, over the Alex Fraser Bridge onto Annacis Island, and through another interchange. Highway 91 then crosses the Annacis Channel bridge, ever so briefly passing through the very corner of New Westminster, and then enters Richmond, at which point it veers west. At the southern entrance to Highway 91, the road was formerly signed as Annacis Highway, however, that name is not commonly used.

In Richmond, where Highway 91 is officially termed the Richmond Freeway but also as the East-West Connector, the route travels west for 10 more km (6 mi), through a junction with Highway 91A and two more interchanges, until it terminates just past its Richmond junction with Highway 99 at Shell Road.

== History ==
=== Recent improvements ===
$10 million had been allocated to convert the existing seagull intersection at 72nd Avenue to an interchange; this junction was in 2009 the only at-grade intersection on Highway 91. Upgrading this interchange would earn Highway 91 the status of a full freeway, but it was reported in the Surrey Leader in 2008 that work on this proposal had ground to a halt because of disagreements between the municipal and provincial governments over the type of interchange that would be in place. The allocated funding had since been diverted for other uses, and as of 2011 the province had no intention of building the interchange, but in April 2013, International Trade Minister Ed Fast announced that the removal of the traffic signal at 72nd Avenue would be given the go-ahead. On June 8, 2016, the BC government announced that the construction of a new interchange at 72nd Avenue, priced at $30 million, would commence in the fall, thereby removing the final traffic signals on Highway 91. Construction commenced in late 2016. On August 12, 2018, the new interchange opened to remove the final traffic light on Highway 91.

In early 2009, another interchange was agreed upon to be added to Highway 91 just south of the 'S' curve in Richmond, connecting Nelson Road to the highway. The interchange was opened on August 22, 2011.

On January 19, 2017, announcement was made that a new seventh travel lane will be added on Alex Fraser Bridge by slightly narrowing the existing lanes and removing the shoulders. A counterflow system with a movable barrier was added to help ease traffic during morning and afternoon rush hours. The new seventh lane opened to traffic on September 14, 2019, with the moveable reversible zipper in operation on December 16, 2019. As a result of narrower travel lanes, the maximum speed limit over the bridge was lowered from 90 km/h (56 mph) to 70 km/h (43 mph).

== Exit list ==
From south to north. The entire route is in Metro Vancouver Regional District.

| Location | km | mi | Exit | Destinations | Notes |
|---|---|---|---|---|---|
| Delta | 0.00 | 0.00 | — | Highway 99 – USA border, Vancouver | Highway 91 southern terminus; Highway 99 exit 16 |
| Delta | 2.02 | 1.26 | 1 | Highway 10 east / Ladner Trunk Road west – Surrey, Langley | No access from northbound Highway 91 to westbound Ladner Trunk Road |
| Delta | 4.90 | 3.04 | 4 | 64th Avenue | |
| Delta | 6.53 | 4.06 | 6 | 72nd Avenue | |
| Delta | 7.93 | 4.93 | 8 | Highway 91C to Highway 17 / Highway 1 (TCH) / Nordel Way – Ferries | Access to Highway 17 via Highway 91 Connector; Highway 17 exit 23B; BC Ferries to Victoria (Swartz Bay) and Nanaimo (Duke Point) |
| Delta | 8.32– 10.85 | 5.17– 6.74 | Alex Fraser Bridge over the South Arm Fraser River | | |
| Delta | 11.04 | 6.86 | 10 | Annacis Island (Cliveden Avenue) | Southbound exit via exit 11 |
| Richmond | 11.82 | 7.34 | 11 | Highway 91A north – New Westminster | Directional signage changes from north-south to east-west |
| Richmond | 13.31 | 8.27 | 13 | Westminster Highway | |
| Richmond | 16.33 | 10.15 | 15 | Nelson Road | Eastbound exit and westbound entrance |
| Richmond | 20.82 | 12.94 | 21 | No. 6 Road | Westbound exit and eastbound entrance |
| Richmond | 21.22 | 13.19 | 22 | Knight Street – Vancouver | Access to northbound Knight Street only |
| Richmond | 22.91 | 14.24 | 23 | Highway 99 – Ferries, Airport, Vancouver Alderbridge Way west – Richmond City Centre | Highway 91 northern terminus; BC Ferries to Victoria (Swartz Bay) and Nanaimo (Duke Point); Highway 99 exit 37; continues as Alderbridge Way |
1.000 mi = 1.609 km; 1.000 km = 0.621 mi: Incomplete access

== Highway 91 Connector ==
- Highway 91 Connector; Highway 91C; Unsigned Highway 901:3146 (E/B); Unsigned Highway 901:3147 (W/B)
- Length: 2.2 km (1.4 mi)
- West end: Highway 17 Trumpet Interchange
- Major junctions: Highway 17; Highway 91
- East end: Nordel Way at BNSF overpass

Highway 91 Connector (Highway 91C) is a short 2.2 km (1.4 mi) unsigned highway connecting Highway 91 at Nordel Way and Highway 17 in Delta. It formerly started at the BNSF Railway level crossing on 96 Street. Today, the route starts at a trumpet interchange with Highway 17, crosses over Highway 91 via twin overpasses, and ends at the BNSF overpass on Nordel Way.

From its opening, the route faced heavy congestion due to the presence of a truck scale and at-grade intersections. The Highway 17 and Highway 91C intersection saw several truck rollover accidents since its opening in 2013 and engineer's report revealed that trucks are susceptible to rollover when exceeding 26 km/h (16 mph) while turning from Highway 17 to Highway 91C. The report recommended installation of truck rollover warning sign and an advisory speed limit of 20 km/h (12 mph) with the ultimate long-term solution to be an upgrade to grade-separated interchange.

In 2017, the Province announced Highway 91C will be upgraded to a freeway standard as a part of $254 million project. However, the project was partially downscaled and two at-grade intersections remain in the Highway 91/91C interchange. Traffic from southbound Highway 91 and westbound Nordel Way flows freely, while signals remain for traffic movements on the new southern overpass.

The grade separation work on Highway 91C started in 2020 and free-flow interchanges were constructed at Highway 17 and Nordel Way (west) with improved partially at-grade connections for Highway 91 ramps. The project reached substantial completion by the end of November 2022 with remaining works extended up until May 31, 2023.

=== Major intersections ===
From west to east. The entire route is in Delta, Metro Vancouver Regional District.

| km | mi | Destinations | Notes |
|---|---|---|---|
| 0.00 | 0.00 | Highway 17 to Highway 1 (TCH) / River Road (west) – South Delta, Ferries | Interchange |
| 0.99 | 0.62 | Nordel Way (west) / River Road (east) | Interchange |
| 1.69 | 1.05 | Highway 91 – Alex Fraser Bridge, New Westminster, Vancouver, USA border | Interchange; free-flow eastbound; at-grade westbound |
| 2.37 | 1.47 | Nordel Way (east) | Continues east |
1.000 mi = 1.609 km; 1.000 km = 0.621 mi
