= Annacis Island Swing Bridge =

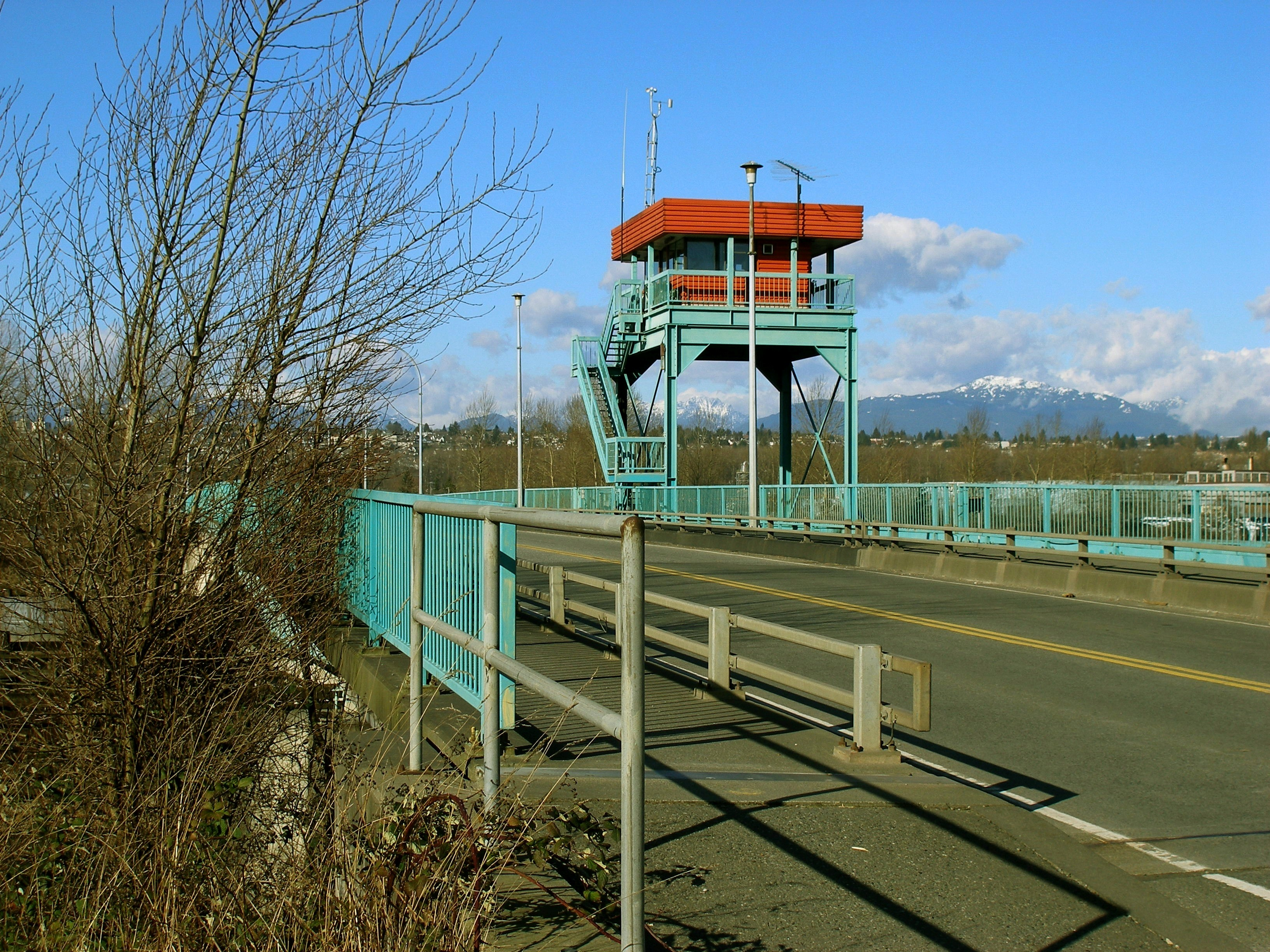
- Coordinates: 49.18636°N 122.932312°W
- Carries: Two lanes of Derwent Way, railway, pedestrians, bicycles
- Crosses: Annacis Channel
- Locale: New Westminster; Delta

Characteristics
- Clearance below: 2.3 m (7 ft 7 in)

History
- Opened: 1986

Statistics
- Daily traffic: 15–20 trains (as of 2024)

Location
- Interactive map of Annacis Island Swing Bridge

The Annacis Island Swing Bridge, built in 1986, is a road and rail swing bridge over the Annacis Channel of the Fraser River in the Lower Mainland of British Columbia, Canada. The bridge connects the community of Queensborough, part of New Westminster on Lulu Island, to Annacis Island in Delta.

It replaced the Derwent Way Bridge built in 1955 at the same location.

== See also ==
- List of bridges in Canada
