= Auckland Harbour Bridge =

Road bridge in Auckland, New Zealand

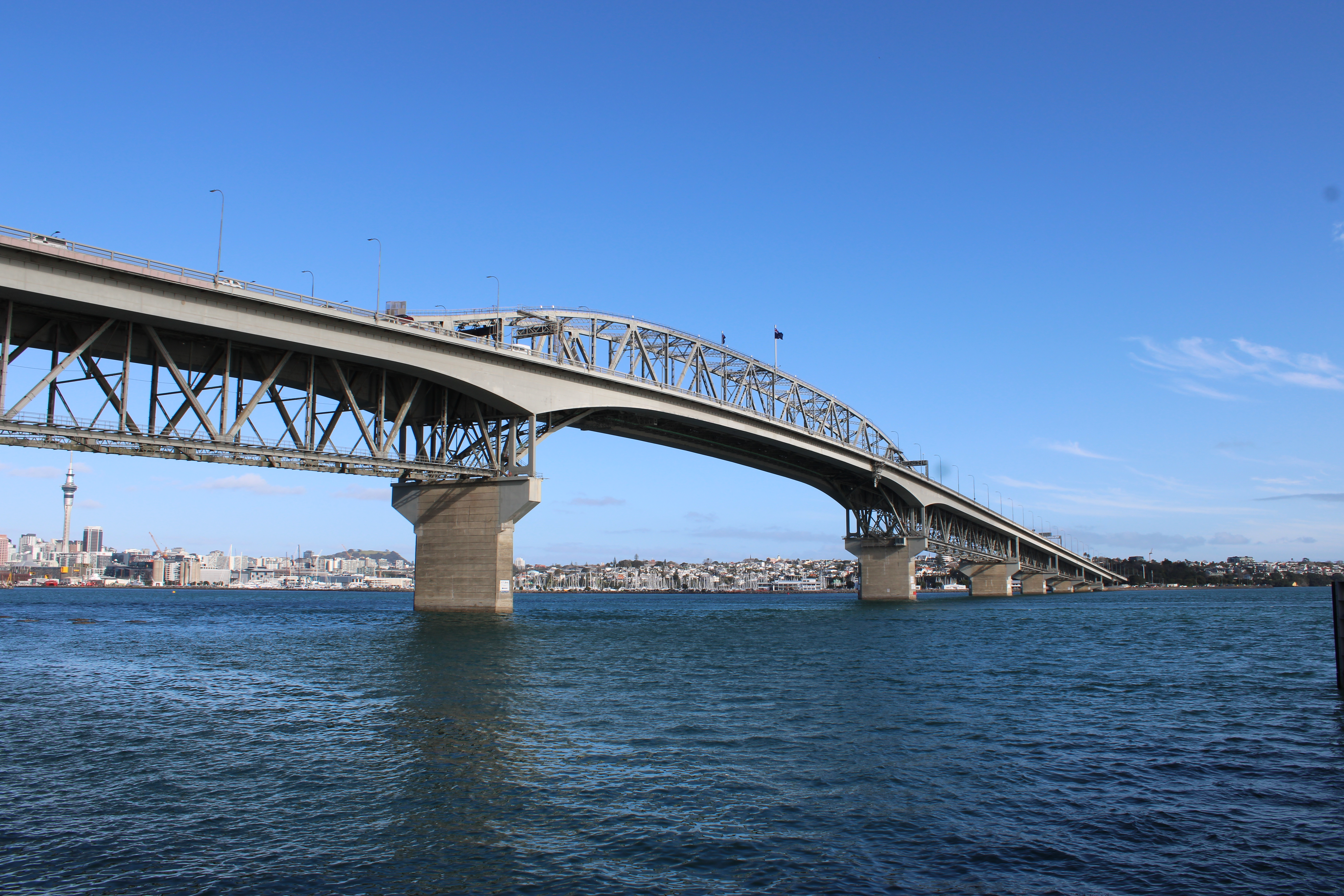
- Auckland Harbour Bridge, seen from the North Shore looking toward Auckland City (2024).
- Coordinates: 36°49′46″S 174°44′47″E
- Carries: Auckland Northern Motorway (as part of SH 1)
- Crosses: Waitematā Harbour
- Locale: Auckland, New Zealand
- Begins: Westhaven
- Ends: Northcote Point
- Maintained by: New Zealand Transport Agency

Characteristics
- Design: Original bridge structure; Through arch bridge; Clip-ons; Box girder
- Trough construction: Box truss using steel
- Pier construction: Reinforced concrete
- Total length: 1,020 metres (3,350 ft)
- Width: 35.4 metres (116.1 ft); Original main bridge structure; 13.4 metres (44 ft); Clip-ons; 11 metres (36 ft) each
- Height: 64 metres (210 ft) (from water up)
- Longest span: 243.8 metres (800 ft)
- No. of spans: 9
- Piers in water: 6
- Load limit: Clip-ons; 13.0 tonnes (28,700 lb)
- Clearance above: Original bridge structure; 4.8 metres (16 ft)
- Clearance below: 43 metres (141 ft) at high tide
- No. of lanes: 8 in total; 4 original bridge structure; 4 clip-ons

History
- Designer: Freeman Fox & Partners
- Constructed by: original superstructure: • Dorman Long; • Cleveland Bridge & Engineering Company; clip-ons: • IHI Corporation
- Construction start: original superstructure: • 1954; clip-ons: • 1967
- Construction end: original superstructure: • April 1959; clip-ons: • September 1969
- Construction cost: original superstructure: £7,516,000 (1959 value)
- Opened: original superstructure: • 30 May 1959 (67 years ago); clip-ons: • 22 September 1969 (57 years ago)

Statistics
- Daily traffic: Average: 170,000 (2022); Peak: 200,000 (2022)
- Toll: None (since 31 March 1984)

Location
- Interactive map of Auckland Harbour Bridge

The Auckland Harbour Bridge is an eight-lane motorway bridge over Waitematā Harbour in Auckland, New Zealand. It joins St Marys Bay on the Auckland city side with Northcote on the North Shore side. It is part of State Highway 1 and the Auckland Northern Motorway. The bridge is operated by the NZ Transport Agency Waka Kotahi (NZTA). It is the second-longest road bridge in New Zealand, and the longest in the North Island.

The original inner four lanes, opened in 1959, are of box truss construction. Two lanes were added to each side in 1968–1969 and are of orthotropic box structure construction extend as cantilevers from the original piers. The bridge is 1,020 m (3,348 ft) long, with a main span of 243.8 metres (800 feet) rising 43.27 metres (142 feet) above high water, allowing ships access to the deepwater wharf at the Chelsea Sugar Refinery, one of the few such wharves west of the bridge.

While often considered an Auckland icon, many see the construction of the bridge without walking, cycling, or rail facilities as an oversight. In 2016, an add-on structure providing a walk-and-cycleway called SkyPath received Council funding approval and planning consent, but was not built. In 2021, a stand-alone walking and cycling bridge called the Northern Pathway was announced by the New Zealand Government, but also was not built.

About 170,000 vehicles cross the bridge each day (as of 2019), including over 1,000 buses, which carry 38% of all people crossing during the morning peak.

== History ==
=== Early proposals ===
Proposals for a harbour crossing date back to at least 1860, when North Shore farmers sought for more convenient way to transport livestock and produce to city markets. They commissioned Ponsonby farmer Fred Bell, who proposed a pontoon bridge at an estimated cost of £16,000. In the following decades, at least one major new crossing scheme was suggested in each decade. Interest waned during the First World War, but was renewed in the post-war period. For example, the 1927 and 1929 harbour crossing proposals. Two Royal Commissions in 1930 and 1946 were held on the viability of a bridge crossing the Waitemata.

=== Design approval ===
Prior to the opening of the bridge in 1959, the quickest way from Auckland to the North Shore was by passenger or vehicular ferry. The fastest way via car was through the Coatesville-Riverhead Highway, now part of State Highway 18.

In the 1950s, when the bridge was being built, North Shore was a mostly rural area of barely 50,000 people, with few jobs and a growth rate half that of Auckland south of the Waitematā Harbour. Opening up the area via a new route unlocked the potential for further expansion of Auckland.

=== Construction ===
==== Original bridge construction (1954–1959) ====
The 1946 Royal Commission report recommended a four lane harbour bridge, with 44 feet (13 m) carriageway between kerbs and two pedestrian footpaths that are 6 feet (1.8 m) wide each. The Royal Commission also considered two alternative options, a wider 60 feet (18 m) bridge with four lanes, and a 23 feet (7.0 m) wide two lane tunnel. The First National Government of New Zealand opting for an 'austerity' design of four lanes without footpaths, and including an approach road network only after local outcry over traffic effects. The decision to reduce the bridge in this way has been called "a ringing testament to [...] the peril of short-term thinking and penny-pinching". On 1 December 1950, an act of parliament formed the Auckland Harbour Bridge Authority, chaired by Sir John Allum, then Mayor of Auckland City, who appointed British firm Freeman Fox & Partners to design the bridge.

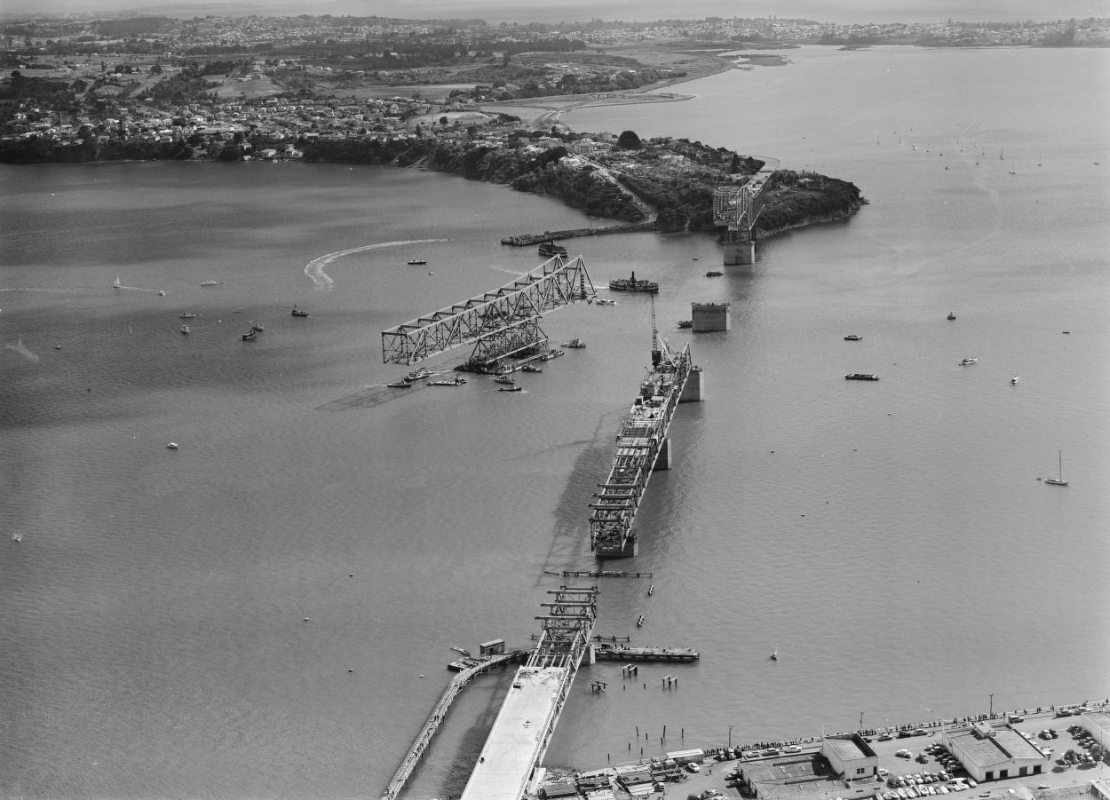
The bridge under construction in 1958

The bridge took four years to build, with Dorman Long (who had constructed the Sydney Harbour Bridge) and the Cleveland Bridge & Engineering Company contracted to construct the bridge in October 1954. The first stage of construction involved land reclamation at the Westhaven Marina, which was completed by September 1955. The steel girder structure pieces were fabricated in England and shipped to New Zealand. The steel bridge structure began construction in December 1956. Hundreds of labourers were employed on the construction including 180 men sent out from the UK. Progress was slowed with the workers going on strike in 1956 and 1957. The large steel girder sections were partially pre-assembled, then floated into place on construction barges. One of the main spans was almost lost during stormy weather when the barge began to drift, but the tugboat William C Daldy won a 36-hour tug-of-war against the high winds.

The bridge was constructed from opposing sides of the harbour. The southern section was cantilevered, until both sides were joined in March 1959. Completed in April 1959, three weeks ahead of schedule, the bridge was officially opened on 30 May 1959 by the Governor-General Lord Cobham. An open day had been held, when 106,000 people had walked across. The opening period was extremely busy, despite the poor weather in Auckland experienced in June 1959. Either three or four men had been killed by accidents during construction, and the names of three of them are recorded on a memorial plaque underneath the bridge at the Northcote end.

The hollow girder design by Freeman, Fox and Partners design was unprecedented in New Zealand, and fell outside the 1950s building codes in New Zealand. Initial plans for the bridge were for an extremely slender structure, only 2.9 metres thick, due to the competing specifications from two stakeholders: the National Roads Board specified the gradient and locations where the bridge could launch from the shore on either side of the harbour, while the Auckland Harbour Board required an opening of 43.5 metres above the high tide point. Public Works commissioner Bob Norman, concerned about the narrow bridge design, attempted to negotiate with both the Roads Board and Harbour Board for additional width allowance for the bridge. The Harbour Board required the 43.5 metre clearance so that the entire fleet of ships operating within New Zealand could navigate the harbour, the largest of which was the P&O cruise liner SS Canberra. Norman argued that the Canberra was extremely unlikely to use the only major dock west of the bridge at the Chelsea Sugar Refinery, so the Harbour Board agreed to a smaller opening. This allowed Freeman Fox and Partners to redesign the bridge, increasing the width of the deep centre span from 2.9 metres to 4.12 metres. By the 1970s, many box girder bridges began to develop structural problems, such as the Freeman Fox and Partners-designed West Gate Bridge in Melbourne which collapsed during construction in 1970. The Auckland Harbour Bridge was inspected by the design firm, which found that the stiffening member had buckled by 61 mm (2.4 in), so it was decided to strengthen the bridge's girder system.

==== Clip-ons (1967–1969) ====
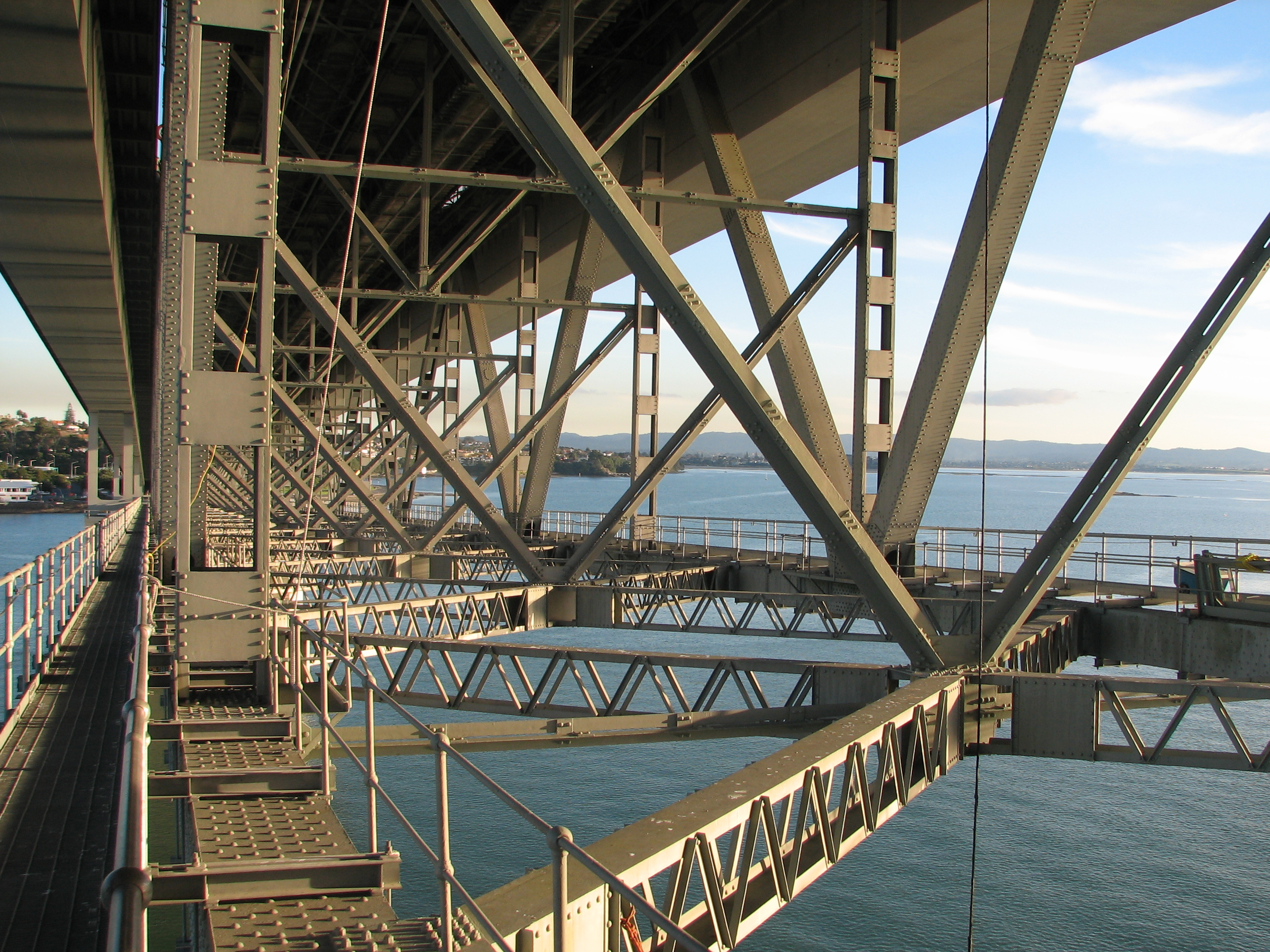
Bridge support structure, underside view facing south-west (2006)

The bridge was originally built with four lanes for traffic. Owing to the rapid expansion of suburbs on the North Shore and increasing traffic levels, it was soon necessary to increase capacity; by 1965, the annual use was about 10 million vehicles, three times the original forecast. In 1967, a contract was given to Japanese firm Ishikawajima-Harima Heavy Industries Co., Ltd. (now IHI Corporation) to construct two steel box girder bridges affixed to the Harbour Bridge, to greatly increase the number of lanes on the bridge. The girder sections were prefabricated in Japan and transported to New Zealand on a converted oil tanker. The eastern section was completed in January 1969, while the western side was completed shortly before the additional lanes were formally opened on 23 September 1969. Each side added two additional lanes to the bridge, doubling the number of lanes to eight.

As the sections were manufactured by a Japanese company, this led to the nickname 'Nippon clip-ons'. The selection of the company was considered a bold move at the time, barely 20 years after WWII and with some considerable anti-Japanese sentiment still existing. The costs of the additions were much higher than if the extra lanes had been provided initially.

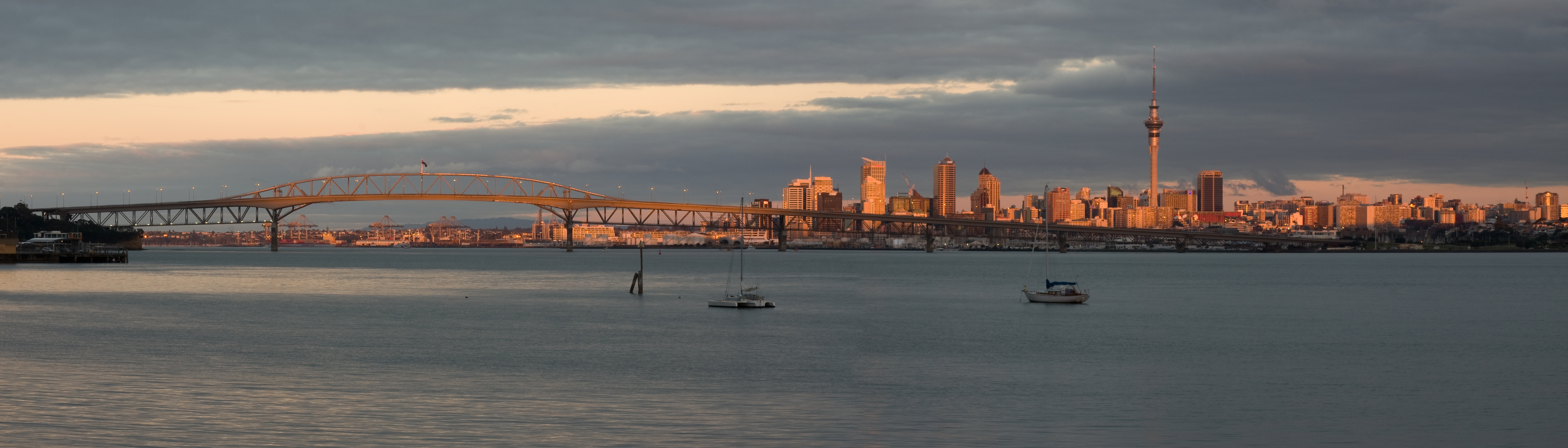
The Auckland CBD skyline and Harbour Bridge at sunset

== Operations and uses ==
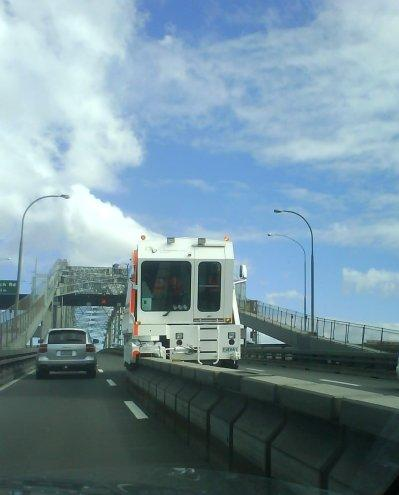
The barrier transfer machine moving the barrier for the afternoon/evening traffic rush

=== Tidal flow ===
A "tidal flow" (dynamic lanes) system is in place, with the direction of the two centre lanes changed to provide an additional lane for peak-period traffic. During the morning peak, five of the eight lanes are for southbound traffic; in the afternoon, five lanes are northbound. At other times, the lanes are split evenly, but peak traffic has become proportionately less – in 1991 there was often a higher than 3:1 difference in directional traffic; in 2006, this had dropped to around 1.6:1. The bridge has an estimated capacity of 180,000 vehicles per day, and in 2006 had an average volume of 168,754 vehicles per day (up from 122,000 in 1991).

In March 1982, the Ministry of Transport and Auckland Harbour Bridge Authority conducted a week-long traffic blitz in an attempt to improve the standard of driving. Of the 600,000 vehicles which used the bridge over this period, 6,000 were stopped, with half of those receiving a ticket and the rest cautioned. A second blitz was held for 36 hours a few weeks later.

For many years, lane directions were indicated by overhead signals. In the late 1980s, a number of fatal head-on accidents occurred when vehicles crossed lane markings into the path of oncoming traffic. In 1988, feasibility investigations began into the use of a movable lane barrier on the Auckland Harbour Bridge. In July 1989, the government approved the project.

==== Moveable barriers ====
In November 1990, a moveable lane barrier (MLB) system, 2.2 km long, became operational. At the time, it was the first concrete safety barrier system of its kind installed on a bridge with a significant grade (5%) and horizontal curvature. Two barrier transfer machines were built in Auckland, with key components sourced from the USA. Capable of travelling at 30 km/h on the road unladen, and 3 km/h when shifting barriers.

In February 2008, new 2.2 km MLB system was installed, which included new barrier transfer machines. A US-based company, Barrier Systems Inc., in California, oversaw the project. The new machines can move the barrier in half the time the old ones did, taking 20 minutes instead of 40.

As part of the Victoria Park Tunnel project, the moveable barrier has been extended southwards to the Fanshawe Street onramp.

=== Tolling (1959–1984) ===
The bridge was funded by government-backed loans, and opened as a toll bridge, the first one in New Zealand, with toll booths at the northern end for north-bound and south-bound traffic. Tolls were originally 2/6 (2 shillings and six pence: approximately $5.50 in 2018) per car but were reduced to 2/- (2 shillings: approximately $4.47 in 2018) after 15 months of operation. The toll remained at 2 shillings until New Zealand changed to decimal currency in July 1967, when that amount became 20 cents in the conversion. It was increased in 1980 from 20 to 25 cents (approximately $1.21 in 2018). Tolling was later made north-bound only before being discontinued on 31 March 1984, and the booths were removed. The toll system was removed as the cost of collection began to outweigh the profits. When this happened, the Auckland Harbour Bridge Authority enquired if the National Roads Board would take over operations if the toll booths were removed, which they agreed to. When the bridge became toll free, most of the Auckland Harbour Bridge Authority staff were absorbed into the roads board.

Some critics have alleged that the routing of State Highway 1 over the bridge was motivated by the need to create toll revenue, and led to a decades-long delay on finishing the Western Ring Route around Auckland, significantly contributing to the need for a massive motorway through the city centre of Auckland and severely damaging inner-city suburbs such as Freemans Bay and Grafton.

=== Event management ===
As part of large events such as the Auckland Marathon, normal motorway restrictions on access are sometimes relaxed. December 2011 was the first time that cyclists were officially allowed on the bridge, for a race / community cycling event organised by Telstra Clear, Auckland Transport, NZTA and Cycle Action Auckland, also allowing cyclists on the Northern Busway. Up to 9,000 riders were protected by 160 stationary buses used as a 'guard of honour' between the bridge end and the Northern Busway from traffic on the rest of the motorway.

=== Utilities ===
The bridge supports several utility services, including water and gas pipelines and fibre-optic telecommunications cables.

Transpower reached agreement with Transit in 2005 for the installation of cable supports beneath the bridge for a future cross-harbour power cable. In 2012, Transpower installed three 220,000-volt cables on the bridge, linking Hobson Street substation in the Auckland CBD to the Wairau Road substation on the North Shore.

=== Tourism ===
==== Bungy jumping and Bridge Climb ====
AJ Hackett operates a 40-metre (130 ft) bungy jump experience and a guided bridge climb over the arch truss. In popular culture, Bryan Bruce's television documentary The Bridge (2002) featured footage of the first bungy jump from the Auckland Harbour Bridge.

==== Vector lights ====
Vector Limited, a utility company in New Zealand, uses LED lights with various colours to illuminate the bridge for ornamental reasons. The lights are powered by renewable energy and the installation was completed in November 2017.

== Maintenance and notable issues ==
=== Long-term maintenance and strengthening: clip-ons ===
The clip-ons have been plagued by significant issues. In 1987, cracks required major repair works, and in 2006, further cracks and signs of material fatigue were found. Auckland City Council's Transport Committee requested Transit New Zealand to investigate the future of the clip-ons as part of its ten-year plan. Transit noted that the plan already includes some funding for bridge maintenance.

In May 2007, Transit proposed a by-law change banning vehicles over 4.5 tonnes from the outside lane on each clip-on to reduce stress on the structure. This was changed in July 2007 to a bylaw banning vehicles of 13 tonnes or more, based on the high level of voluntary compliance during the previous months.

In 2007, it was announced that NZ$45 million in maintenance work on the clip-ons was brought forward as part of good practice. In October 2007, a 2006 report from Beca Group surfaced in the press, noting that the clip-ons were at risk of catastrophic, immediate failure in circumstances such as a traffic jam trapping a large number of trucks. Transit noted that this situation was extremely unlikely, and measures already implemented would prevent it from occurring. In January 2008, it became known that even after the multimillion-dollar maintenance works, a full ban for trucks on all clip-on lanes might be required, or the working life could be reduced to only ten more years.

In late 2009, it was announced that due to greater than expected complexity of the task and increasing material costs for the 920 tons of reinforcing material instead of the approximately half amount of that originally envisaged, clip-on maintenance costs had increased by a further NZ$41 million. NZTA noted that the clip-ons would not be able to be strengthened again after the current works were finished. However, after completion of the upgrade, the bridge would have a further life of between 20 and 40 years if truck restrictions were reintroduced in 10–20 years on the northbound clip-on.

=== Resonance ===
The natural sway motion of people walking on the bridge's clip-on segment during special events such as the Auckland Marathon can lead the bridge to oscillate sideways. It has been reported that the oscillations can inflict "serious crushing injuries". The bridge's movement is caused by synchronous lateral excitation, a positive feedback phenomenon. It has been a known issue since at least 1975, and the lateral frequency is reported to be at 0.67 Hz.

=== Seismic vulnerability and mitigation ===
In 1996, NZTA began a seismic screening programme to identify existing bridges that may sustain damage in an earthquake. Over several years following the assessment, the bridge has completed seismic retrofit.

=== Ship strike risks ===
The Baltimore Key Bridge collapse in March 2024 prompted NZTA to review Auckland Harbour Bridge safety measures. The review classified the risk of vessel allision with the bridge as "rare," citing multiple existing safety measures. The review also stated that Chelsea sugar ship is the only cargo ship that passes under the bridge, once every six weeks.

=== Suicides ===
The bridge is associated with suicide attempts. In 2010, a news article reported that one to two individuals die by suicide at the location per year. In 2019, a feasibility study of retrofitting suicide prevention barrier was published. It examined two types of barriers, a vertical anti-climb barrier and horizontal fall prevention barrier. As of 2024, no barriers have been implemented.

=== 2020 structural damage ===
On Friday, 18 September 2020, at approximately 11:00 AM, high winds, with gusts up to 127 kilometres per hour (79 mph), caused a heavy goods vehicle travelling in the central span of the bridge to strike a main diagonal member of the box truss member. The incident reportedly caused severe damage and a significant reduction in daily traffic capacity. Temporary repairs were effected using a locally fabricated replacement member, pending a full engineering analysis and design of the long-term solution. On 4 October, a permanent replacement strut was installed, with all lanes opening again on 7 October 2020. Since the September 2020 incident up until 2024, the bridge has been closed 20 times totalling 435 minutes and costing over $35.6 million in economic damage.

== Proposed shared path ==
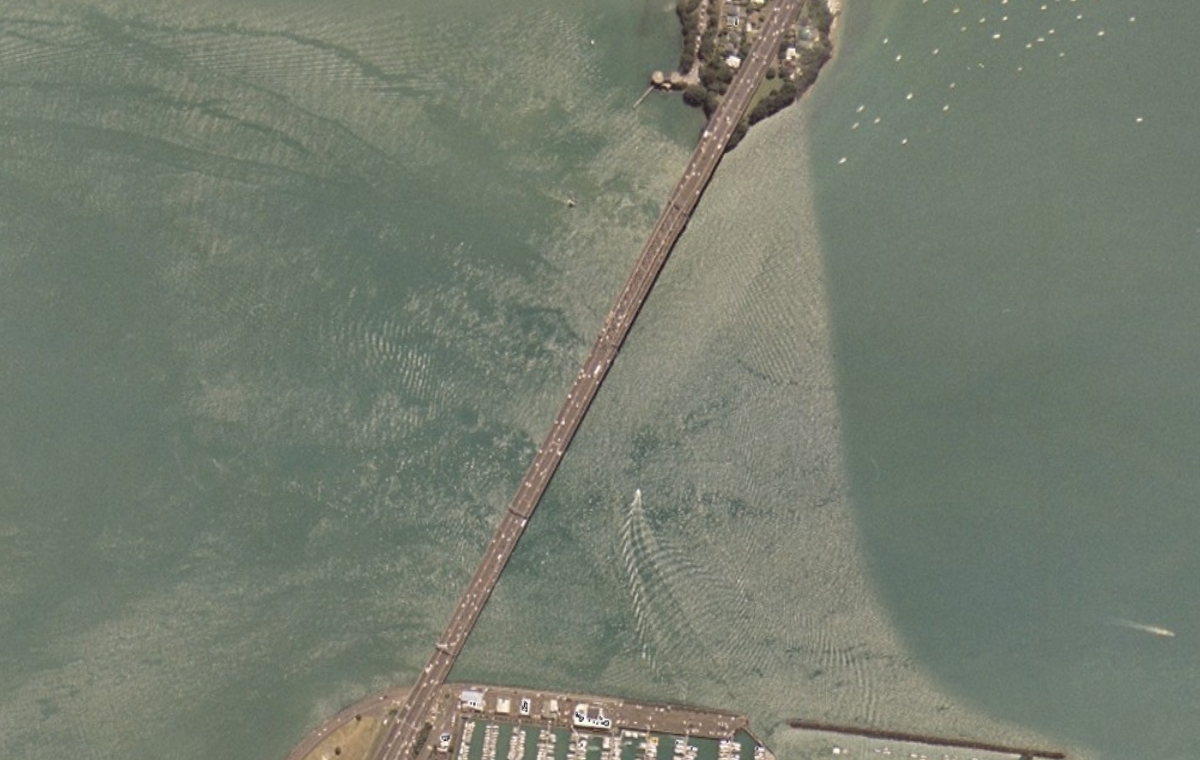
Auckland Harbour Bridge seen from above.

=== Original proposal ===
When the bridge was built, rail lines and walking paths were dropped for cost reasons, and neither were they included during the clip-on construction (people can walk on the span only via guided tours). After the early 1990s increase in public transportation patronage in Auckland, the Ministry of Works and Development investigated if the 'clip-ons' could be used for a light rail system, which they found was feasible if the lanes were used exclusively for this purpose. In 2007 discussions about the addition of a cycle and footpath link were mooted. Transit noted that this would cost between NZ$20 million and $40 million.

A 2008 proposal to modify the clip-ons and potentially widen them to add walking and cycling paths met with different reactions. While Auckland Regional Council and North Shore City Council voted to support it (under certain conditions), Auckland City Council considered the costs to be too high. The NZTA considered the proposal as not having enough merit for the $22–53 million cost, though campaigners noted that the costs cited for the project included 45% contingencies. A proposal from the Auckland Regional Council (one of the proponents) to open up part of the clip-on structure for a walking / cycling trial use over several summer weekends, to show whether it would attract enough users, did not go forward.

The GetAcross group was showcasing its proposed plan, called SkyPath, on its website. Following years of campaigning, Skypath, was promised funding by the Labour Party in the lead-up to the 2017 general election. Once Labour was in government, the project was passed to NZTA which released a revised design in 2019.

In June 2021, Transport Minister Michael Wood announced a new stand-alone walking and cycling bridge would be built on the eastern side of the Auckland Harbour Bridge. The bridge was estimated to cost a total of $785 million and had the support of Auckland mayor Phil Goff.

The plan received criticism from cycling, trucking and other transport advocates, as well as from the government opposition parties. In October 2021, Wood announced the project had been scrapped due to lack of public support. He said NZTA had spent $51 million on designs, consultants and engineering plans for the project up until the end of September, and the final amount spent was not known.

On 6 August 2023, NZTA announced their Waitematā Harbour Crossings plan which includes a tunnel for light rail and a tunnel for motor traffic under the harbour, and walking and cycling on two lanes of the existing Harbour Bridge. It was forecasted that 6400 people would walk and cycle across the Auckland Harbour Bridge every day. This proposal was abandoned under the new government, stating that the government would not fund any projects to allow cycling across the Harbour Bridge.

=== Protests ===
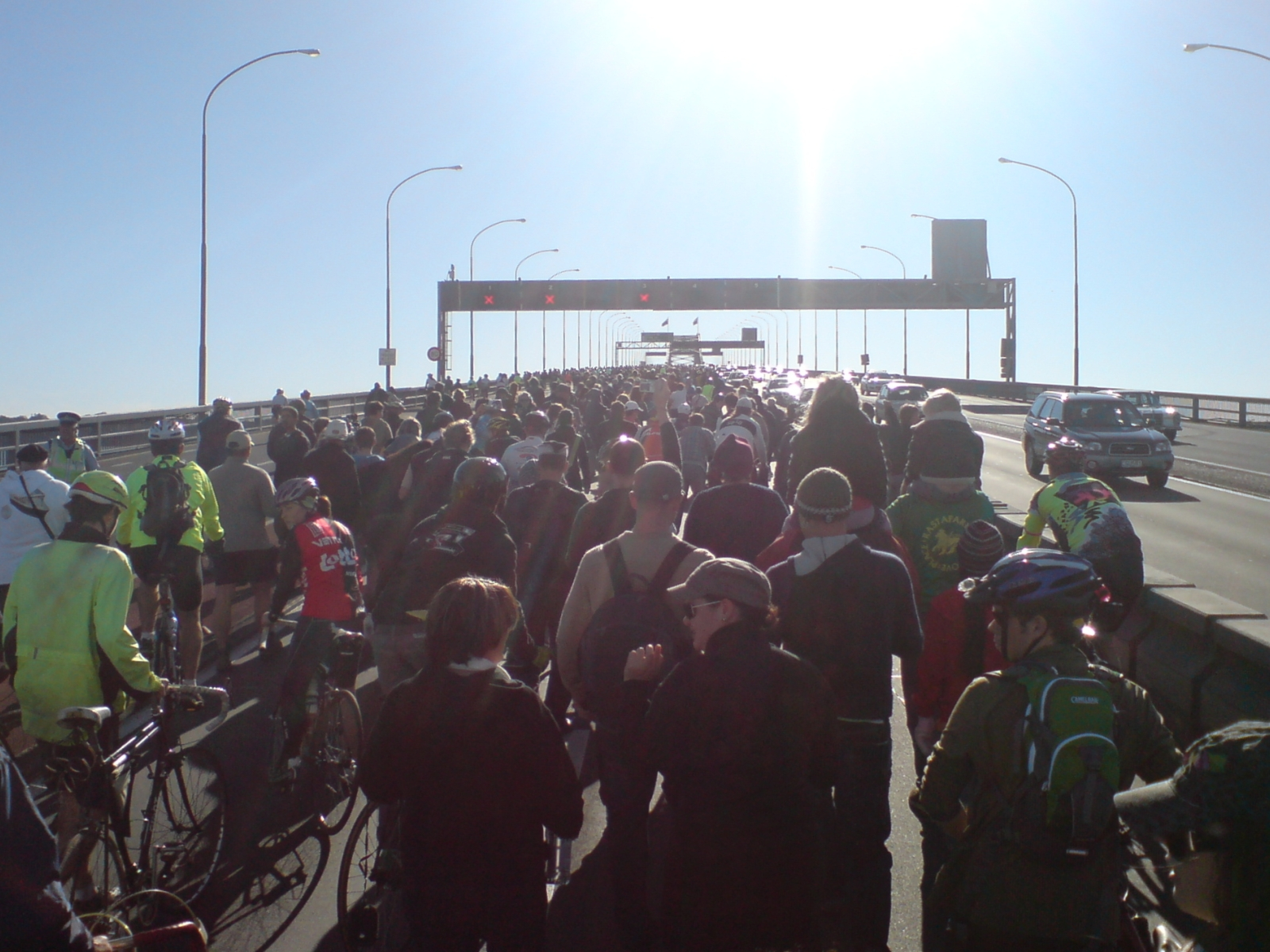
Protesters in favour of a walk and cycleway surge onto the bridge, May 2009.

On Sunday, 24 May 2009, thousands of people crossed the bridge as a part of a protest by GetAcross against the bridge not providing walking and cycling access, and against what the group perceives to be the authorities' negative and obstructionist attitude towards such access. A crossing either as part of the protest or as part of the official 50-year anniversary celebrations had been forbidden by NZTA. Despite this, several people made their way around the police cordon onto the bridge. At that stage police closed the northbound lanes to traffic, bringing State Highway 1 to a stop.

The protest created a wide spectrum of responses in the media and in public perception, from being labelled a dangerous stunt representative of an increasingly lawless, anarchic society to being considered a successful signal to authorities to give more weight to the demands and the public backing of the walk and cycleway proponents. NZTA representatives noted that they were disappointed at what they considered the broken word of the organisers of the protest, and remarked that it would take 30 more years before walking and cycling could likely be provided (see also "Second Harbour Crossing" below).

=== Alternate proposal ===
In late 2009 the GetAcross campaign proposed an alternative option, with a single shared walking and cycling path slung under the eastern clip-on. As confirmed by NZTA, this clip-on has significantly more remaining load capacity and as the proposal would not require widening, the costs have been preliminarily assessed as of the order of NZ$12 million (equivalent to $18.1 million in 2026).

The group proposed to raise the majority of the funding via a loan backed by small tolls. NZTA noted that it would be considering the proposal, should funding be able to be secured by the campaigners.

In 2011, the proposal got new public support when Auckland Mayor Len Brown agreed that a walk- and cycleway was a desirable goal, and instructed Auckland Transport to add it to its strategic priorities. The walk- and cycleway is also to be included in the city centre masterplan. Three council-controlled organisations (CCOs) – Auckland Transport, the Waterfront Development Agency and the Tourism, Events and Economic Development Agency – indicated support for the proposal, as has the Heart of the City (Auckland CBD) business association.

In 2014, the proposed walk and cycleway was publicly notified, and consent was given in 2015. However, this was appealed by three local groups. The decision of the original hearing was upheld in December 2016, and the last appeal rejected by the Environment Court. In the meantime, Council had already provided in principle approval for a public-private partnership funding model, in a unanimous support vote earlier in 2016.

A 2019 announcement said that work on the walking and cycling "clipon" could start in 2020.

On 30 May 2021, more than 1,500 cyclists crossed the bridge following a rally at Point Erin Park organised by Bike Auckland. The rally was motivated by uncertainty around the future of the SkyPath project. NZTA had stopped supporting the project due to technical issues. The Western clip on of the bridge (two motor traffic lanes) had been closed in advance of the rally, with a police cordon blocking access. After Bike Auckland's rally concluded, much of the crowd made their way over to the police cordon and pushed past onto the bridge.

== Second Harbour Crossing ==
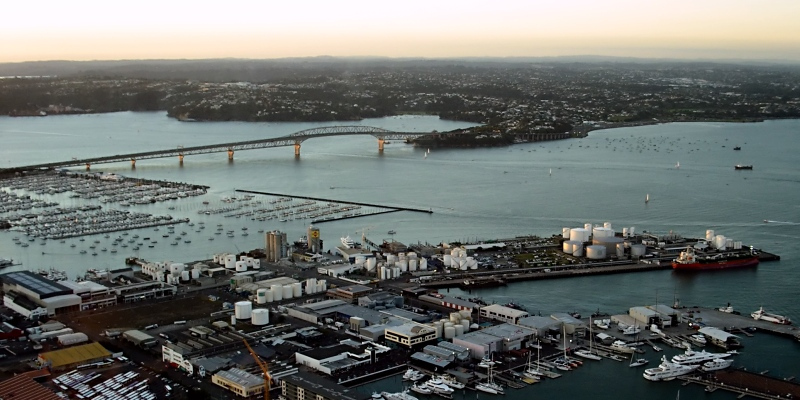
The bridge north-west from the Sky Tower

Almost as soon as the bridge was built it reached capacity, before extension via the clip-ons, and a second crossing of the harbour was mooted. The high costs and the difficulties of connecting it to the motorway network have so far caused plans to remain at concept stage. In 2008, a study group narrowed down around 160 options to a multi-tunnel link approximately one km east of the bridge, with up to four individual tunnels for motorway, public transport and rail.

On 6 August 2023, NZTA announced their Waitematā Harbour Crossings plan which includes a tunnel for light rail and a tunnel for motor traffic, with walking and cycling on two lanes of the existing Harbour Bridge. Construction is expected to start by 2029. Waka Kotahi's forecast is that 6,400 people would walk and cycle across the bridge every day.

== See also ==
=== General ===
- Bridges in New Zealand
- Public transport in Auckland
- Transport in Auckland

=== Specific ===
- Central Motorway Junction, the major motorway junction connecting southeast of the bridge
- Newmarket Viaduct, similarly important traffic bottleneck on other side of Auckland CBD
- Western Reclamation, large industrial area east of the bridge, possible southern end of second crossing
- Upper Harbour Bridge, a motorway bridge in west Auckland
