= Barrier transfer machine =

Heavy vehicle used to transfer concrete lane dividers during rush hours

A barrier being moved on the Golden Gate Bridge

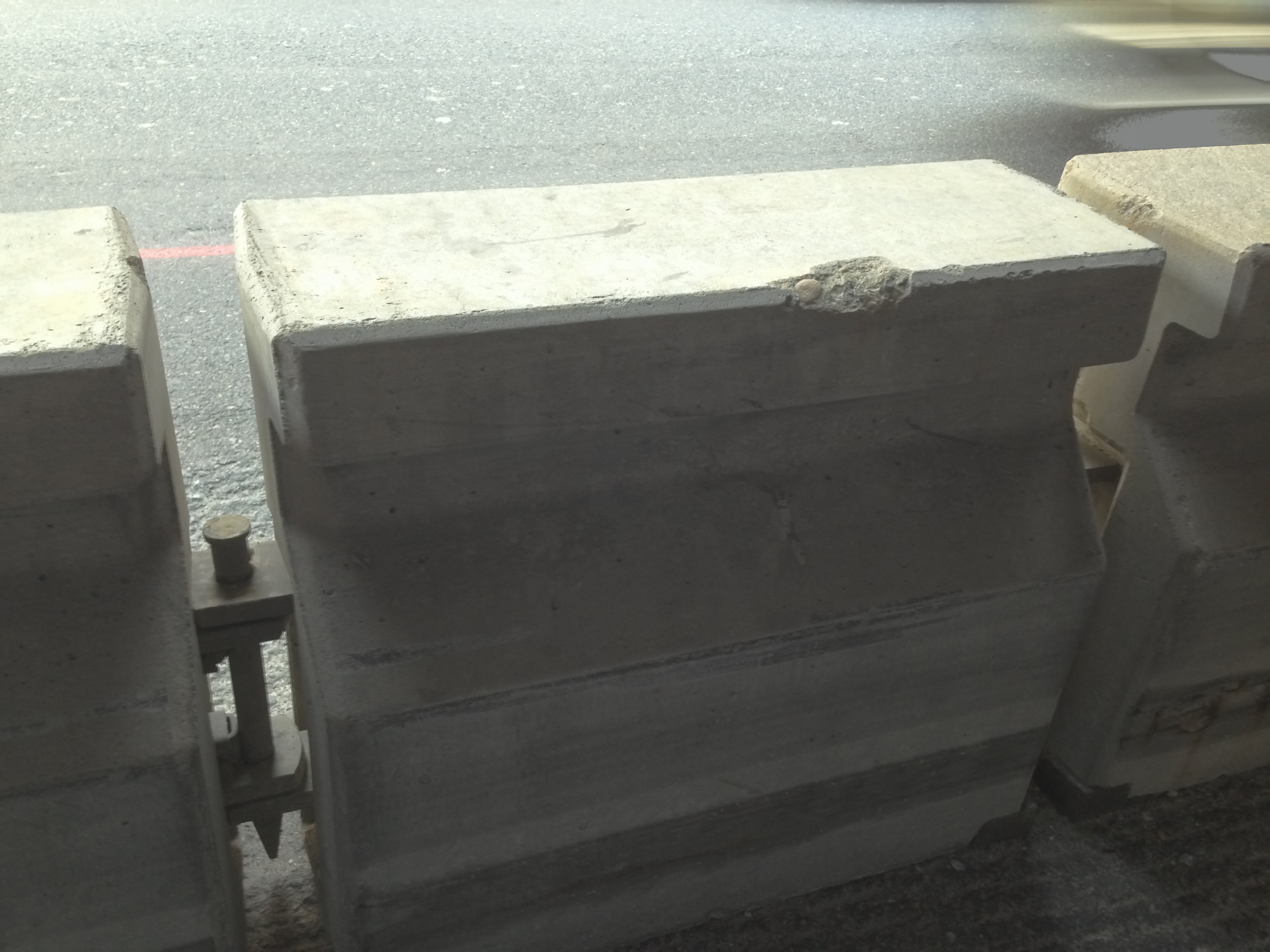
Hinge pin used as the linkage of moveable barriers

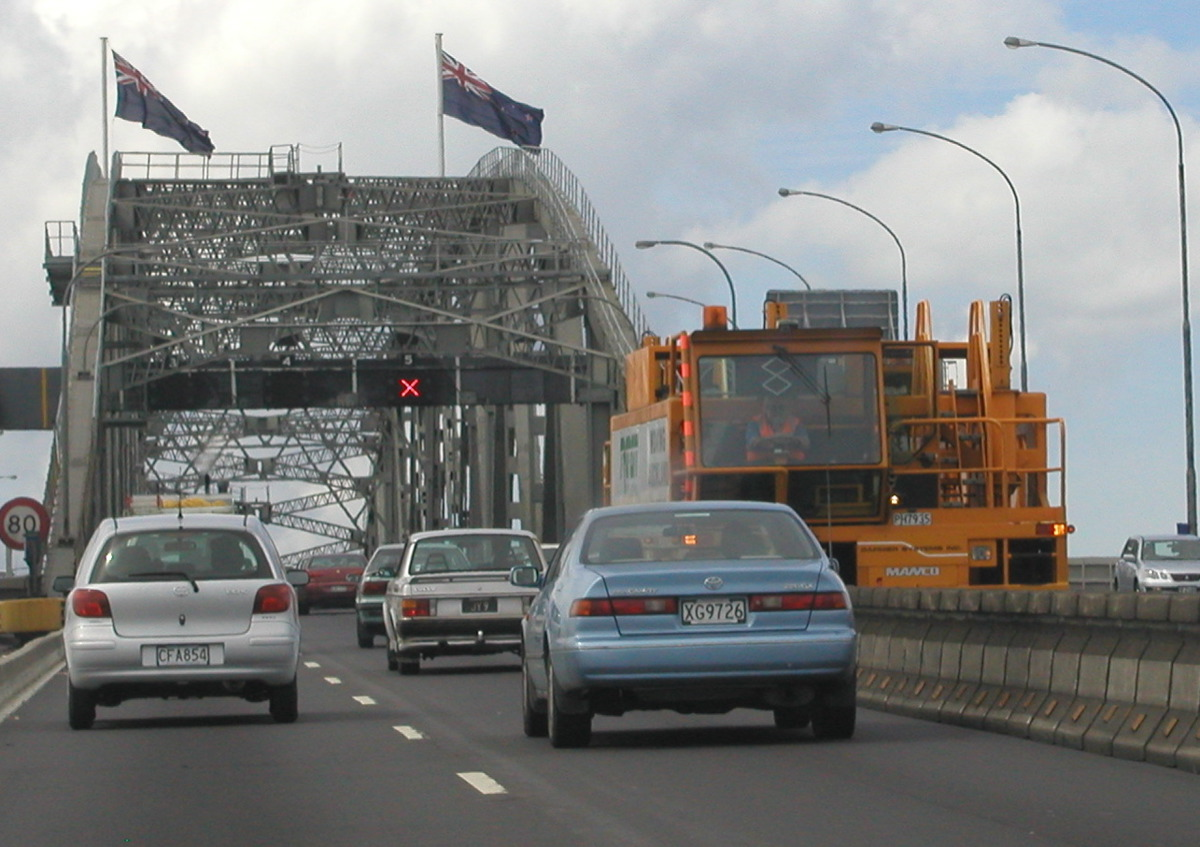
This large machine was used on the Auckland Harbour Bridge to shift the center lane back and forth to accommodate rush hour traffic.

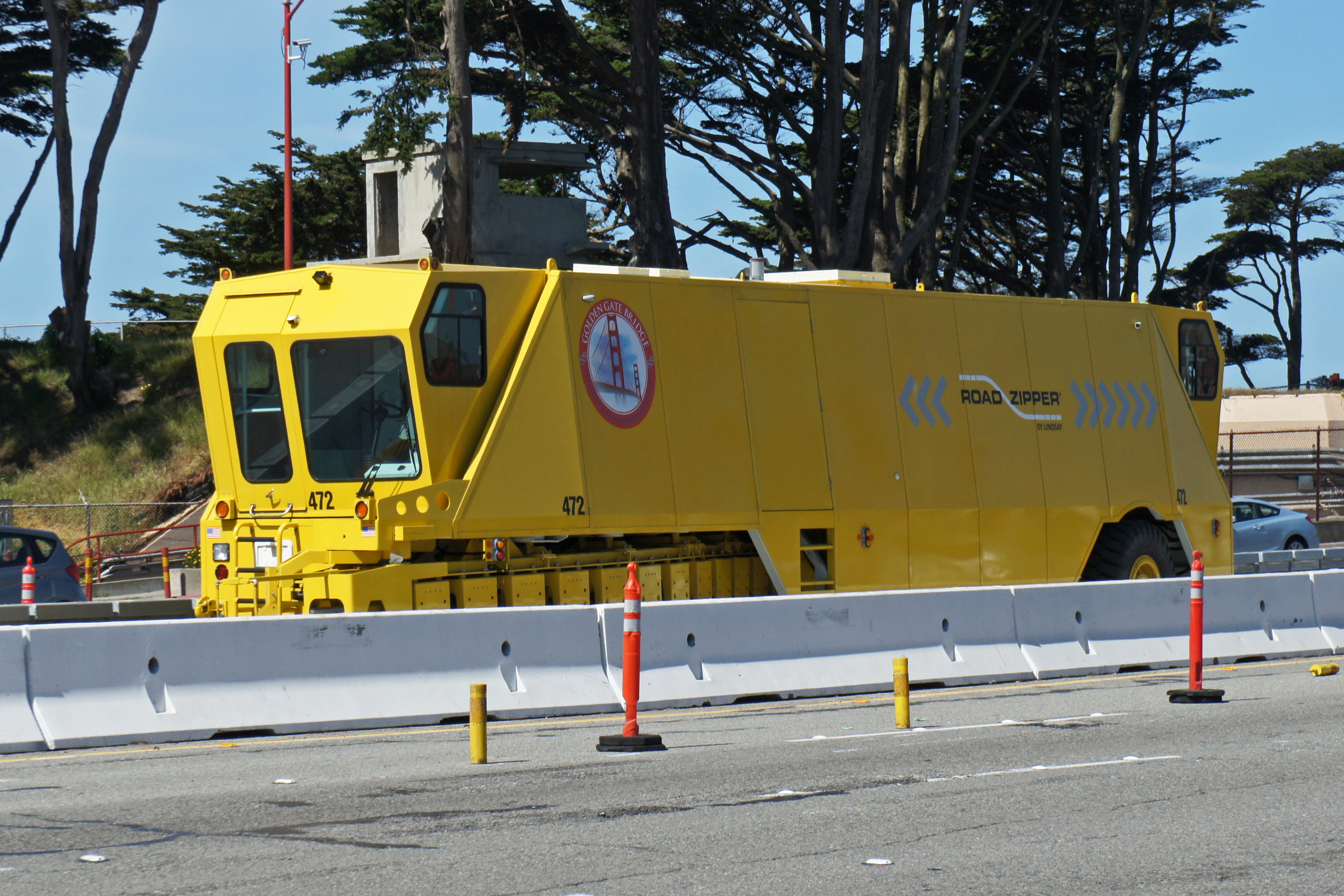
Road Zipper machine at the Golden Gate Bridge, San Francisco, California.

A barrier transfer machine, also known as zipper machine or road zipper, is a type of heavy vehicle that is used to transfer concrete lane dividers, such as Jersey barriers, in order to relieve traffic congestion during rush hours. Many other cities use them temporarily during construction work. The lanes created by the machine are sometimes referred to as "zipper lanes".

One advantage of barrier systems over other lane management treatments such as traffic cones or overhead directional lights is that a solid, positive barrier prevents vehicle collisions due to motorists crossing over into opposing traffic flow. A disadvantage is that lane widths can be slightly reduced.

== History ==
The Road Zipper variant has been in existence since 1984–1985. Auckland Harbour Bridge had its original moveable barrier system installed in 1990. The Hawaii Department of Transportation debuted a zipper Lane on Oahu on August 18, 1998. The Benjamin Franklin Bridge has had a permanent barrier transfer system since 2000, when it was installed by the Delaware River Port Authority. A movable barrier system was introduced in Sydney, NSW, Australia, in 2012. The Golden Gate Bridge had a permanent 13,340-foot (4,070 m) movable barrier system installed in January 2015.

== Operation ==
The vehicle contains an S-shaped, inverted conveyor channel in its undercarriage which lifts the barrier segments (which may weigh over 1,000 pounds (450 kg)) off the road surface and transfers them over to the other side of the lane, reallocating traffic lanes to accommodate increased traffic for the currently dominant (peak) direction. These barriers are linked together with steel connectors to create a sturdy but flexible safety barrier.

The minimum length for some barrier systems is 100 feet (30 m). The length can vary based on application and the amount of barrier needed to effectively deflect an errant vehicle.

Some barrier systems have four rubber feet on the bottom of each segment “to increase the coefficient of friction between the barrier element and the road surface”. This helps the barrier resist vehicle impact and keeps the barrier from moving significantly if struck.

Barrier transfer machines can typically move their barrier segments anywhere between 4 and 24 feet (1.2 and 7.3 m) in one pass, usually at a speed between 5 and 10 miles per hour (8.0 and 16.1 km/h). Some models of the machine hold 50 feet (15 m) of barrier at a time as they are engaged in transferring. The machine can transfer within the regular traffic flow without hindering other vehicles:

Admirably engineered, the barrier-moving process does not compromise traffic flow in either direction, and the truck is shielded by the blocks it's moving. If you're traveling in the same direction as the truck, the lane it's working behind is already blocked. And if you pass the vehicle at the speed limit, you can safely move into the lane ahead of it. Oncoming motorists, meanwhile, are prevented from entering the zipper's lane by the concrete barriers in front of it, and they can move into a lane after they have passed the truck.

— Ann L. Rappoport, Philly.com

Upon completing its pass, some barrier transfer machines can be moved across outside traffic lanes away from the area. However, other systems simply park in a median between their movable barrier and an affixed barrier to keep them from impeding traffic flow. A barrier transfer machine that operates outside of Honolulu has its own garage in the space between viaducts.

== Permanent locations ==
Moveable barriers are in permanent use in such cities as

City	Country	Road
Auckland	New Zealand	Auckland Harbour Bridge
Boston	United States	Southeast Expressway HOV lanes
Caguas	Puerto Rico	Puerto Rico Highway 52
Dallas	United States	I-30
Honolulu	United States	H-1
Montreal	Canada	Quebec Autoroute 13
New York	United States	Original Tappan Zee Bridge and the western portion of the Long Island Expressway
Philadelphia	United States	Walt Whitman, Commodore Barry, and Benjamin Franklin Bridges (Delaware River Port Authority)
-	Réunion	Route du littoral
San Diego	United States	San Diego-Coronado Bridge and I-15 Express Lanes
San Francisco	United States	Golden Gate Bridge
Richmond, California	United States	Richmond Bridge bike lane
San Juan	Puerto Rico	Puerto Rico Highway 22 and Puerto Rico Highway 18
Sydney	Australia	Victoria Road
Vancouver	Canada	Alex Fraser Bridge
Washington D.C.	United States	Theodore Roosevelt Bridge

== Variants ==
The Road Zipper brand movable barrier model is one vehicle, piloted by two operators located at opposite ends of it, typically at a 25-degree angle (the "crab angle") along the barrier. Sophisticated models can be customized for their application and local road characteristics (grades, curves, etc.). Hydraulically adjustable units and computerized steering guidance systems in such models further aid in accurate transfer vehicle movement and barrier placement. Permanent, sophisticated units can cost around US$1 million each.

Another variant of the machine uses two narrower machines running in tandem. This setup tends to be used in reversible lanes (also known as contraflow lanes) when the movable barrier is used to divide two directions of traffic—the narrower machines are less of an impediment to traffic in either direction.
