= Alex Fraser Bridge =

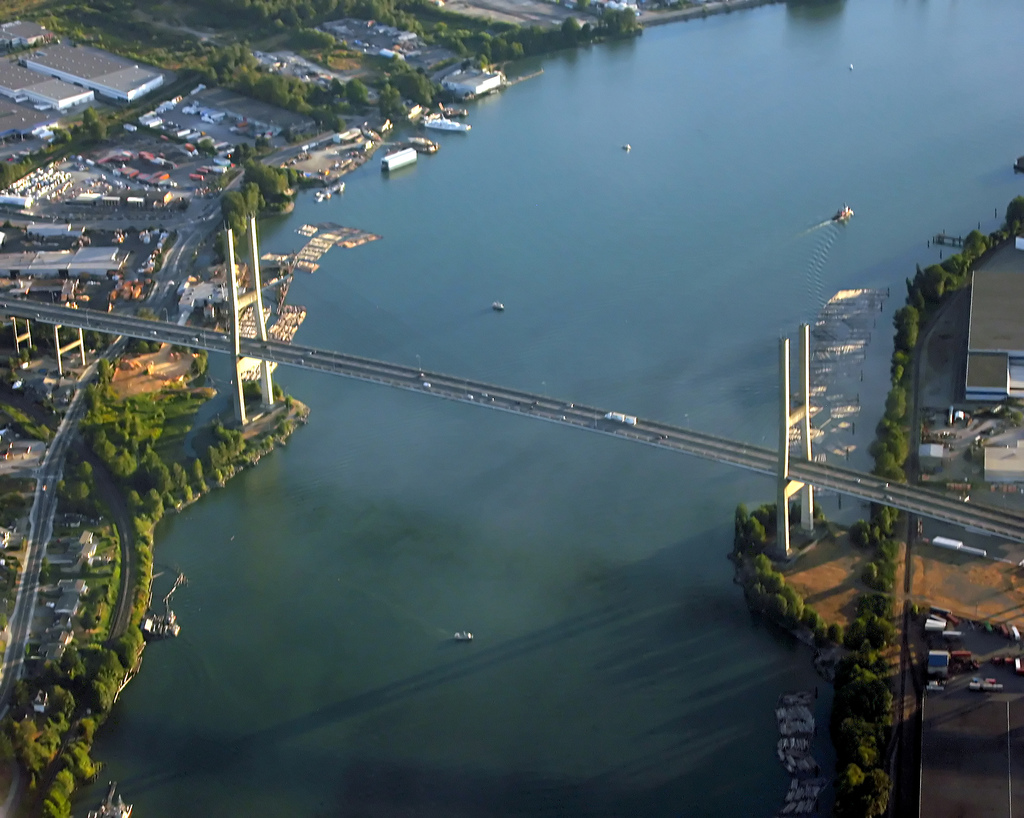
- Alex Fraser Bridge
- Coordinates: 49.1598°N 122.9428°W
- Carries: Seven lanes of British Columbia Highway 91, pedestrians and bicycles
- Crosses: South Arm Fraser River
- Locale: Delta, BC
- Owner: British Columbia Ministry of Transportation and Infrastructure

Characteristics
- Design: cable-stayed bridge
- Material: Steel & Reinforced concrete
- Total length: 2,525 m (8,284 ft)
- Width: 32 m (105 ft)
- Height: 154 m (505 ft)
- Longest span: 465 m (1,526 ft)
- No. of spans: 45
- Clearance below: 57 m (187 ft)

History
- Designer: Buckland & Taylor
- Construction start: 1983
- Construction cost: $58 million
- Opened: September 22, 1986

Statistics
- Daily traffic: 119,000

Location
- Interactive map of Alex Fraser Bridge

References
- structurae.de Ministry of Transportation and Infrastructure

The Alex Fraser Bridge (also known as the Annacis Bridge) is a cable-stayed bridge over the Fraser River that connects Richmond and New Westminster with North Delta in Greater Vancouver, British Columbia. The bridge is named for Alex Fraser, a former British Columbia Minister of Transportation. The bridge was the longest cable-stayed bridge in the world when it opened on September 22, 1986, and was the longest in North America until the Arthur Ravenel Jr. Bridge, in the U.S. state of South Carolina, opened in 2005.

== Overview ==
The Alex Fraser Bridge is 2,525 metres (8,284 ft) long with a main span of 465 metres (1,526 ft). The towers are 154 metres (505 ft) tall. It consists of seven lanes, three in each direction with the middle lane acting as a reversible lane, and had a maximum speed limit of 90 kilometres per hour (56 mph) until July 24, 2019, when the speed limit was lowered to 70 kilometres per hour (43 mph) to accommodate the additional reversible lane. Upon opening in 1986, only four of the six available lanes were open. Cyclists and pedestrians share two narrow sidewalks one on each side. All six lanes opened in 1987 after traffic demand justified the need.

The bridge's southern end is in North Delta and its northern end is on Delta's Annacis Island. Connections on its southern end lead to White Rock and the Canada–United States border at the Peace Arch border crossing. The connections on the northern end lead into the cities of New Westminster, Richmond, and Burnaby, and on into Vancouver itself. It is a major artery in the Lower Mainland of British Columbia.

The bridge was constructed for the British Columbia Ministry of Transportation and was designed by a joint venture of Klohn Crippen Berger and Buckland & Taylor (now COWI North America). Its total cost was $58 million.

== Recent history ==
In December 2016, "ice bombs" (also called "slush bombs") dropped from the Alex Fraser Bridge and the nearby Port Mann Bridge onto vehicles, causing damage to windshields. The Alex Fraser has its cables along the sides of the driving lanes, whereas on the Port Mann, they cross over top of the driving lanes. In addition to 2016, this also happened on the Alex Fraser in 2005, 2008, and 2012. The Alex Fraser needed to be closed a few times during December 2016 due to the possibility of ice bombs; this caused major traffic problems in the region. To combat this issue, the BC government announced that a heavy lift helicopter will be used to blow snow and ice off the cables to prevent it from accumulating and falling onto the cars below.

An announcement was made on January 19, 2017, that a new seventh travel lane would be added on the bridge by slightly narrowing the existing lanes and removing the shoulders. A reversible lane system with a movable barrier was added to help ease traffic during morning and afternoon rush hours. The new seventh lane opened to traffic on September 14, 2019, with the moveable reversible zipper in operation beginning December 16, 2019.

== See also ==
- List of crossings of the Fraser River
- List of bridges in Canada
