= Victoria Street, Auckland =

Street in Auckland city centre, New Zealand

Victoria Street
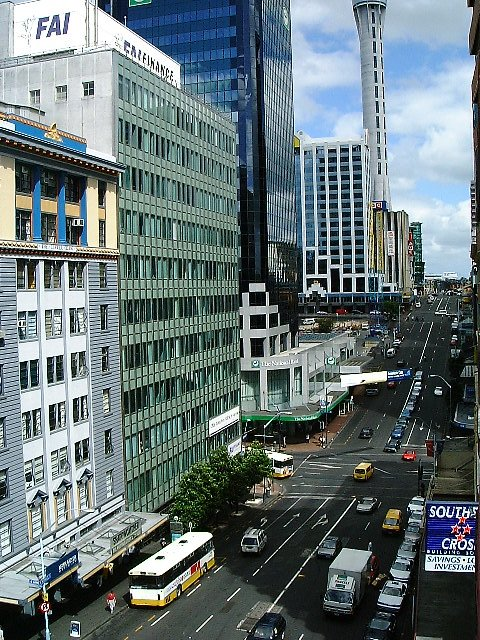
- Victoria Street in 2007, looking west towards the Sky Tower
- Length: 1.42 km (0.88 mi)
- Location: Auckland City Centre, New Zealand
- Postal code: 1010
- Coordinates: 36.84806°S 174.76197°E
- West end: College Hill; Beaumont Street
- Major junctions: Queen Street
- East end: Kitchener Street

Victoria Street is a street in the Auckland City Centre, New Zealand, located between the base of College Hill and Albert Park. The street is split into two sections at the junction of Queen Street, Victoria Street West and Victoria Street East.

== History ==
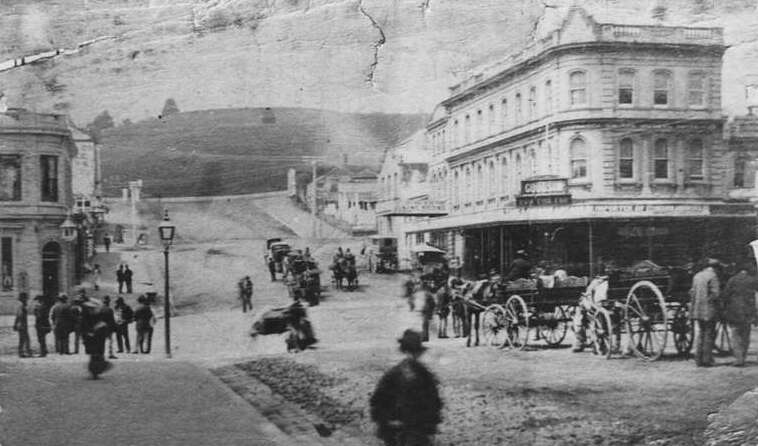
Victoria Street East in the 1870s, looking towards Albert Park

Victoria Street West was formerly part of the foreshore of the Auckland waterfront. Victoria Park was the site of Freemans Bay, which was in-filled during the 19th century. The vent of the Albert Park Volcano was located at the modern location of the Victoria Street Carpark, which was quarried during the 1860s.

Victoria Street was the location of the first jail and courthouse in Auckland. The large block to the south-west of the Queen Street intersection included the courthouse, labour yards and gallows. Development of Victoria Street came later than early Auckland streets, which were focused on the waterfront to the north.

By the 1880s, the Victoria and Queen Street intersection had become one of the busiest locations in Auckland.

In 2024, Te Waihorotiu railway station is planned to open on Victoria Street. Currently Te Hā Noa, a linear park for pedestrians and cyclists is under construction between Federal Street and Kitchener Street.

== Notable locations ==
- Farmers Queen Street, a historic department store and the former location of a Santa Claus sculpture, which was annually attached to the building from 1998 until 2020.
- The Sky Tower, the second tallest tower in the Southern Hemisphere, and the SkyCity Auckland entertainment complex
- Victoria Park, a major park constructed by reclaiming Freemans Bay, a former bay of the Auckland waterfront
- Victoria Park Market, a historic market and retail precinct opposite Victoria Park

== Gallery ==
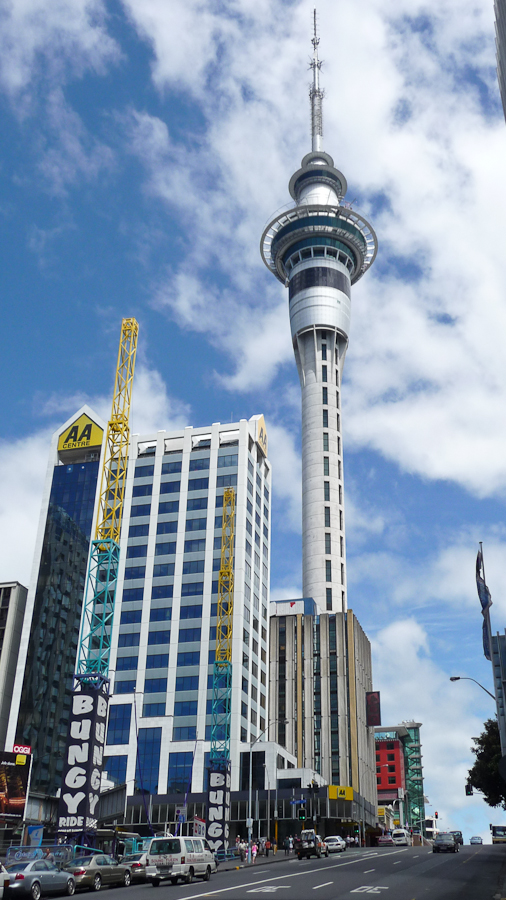
The AA Centre and the Sky Tower, seen from Victoria Street

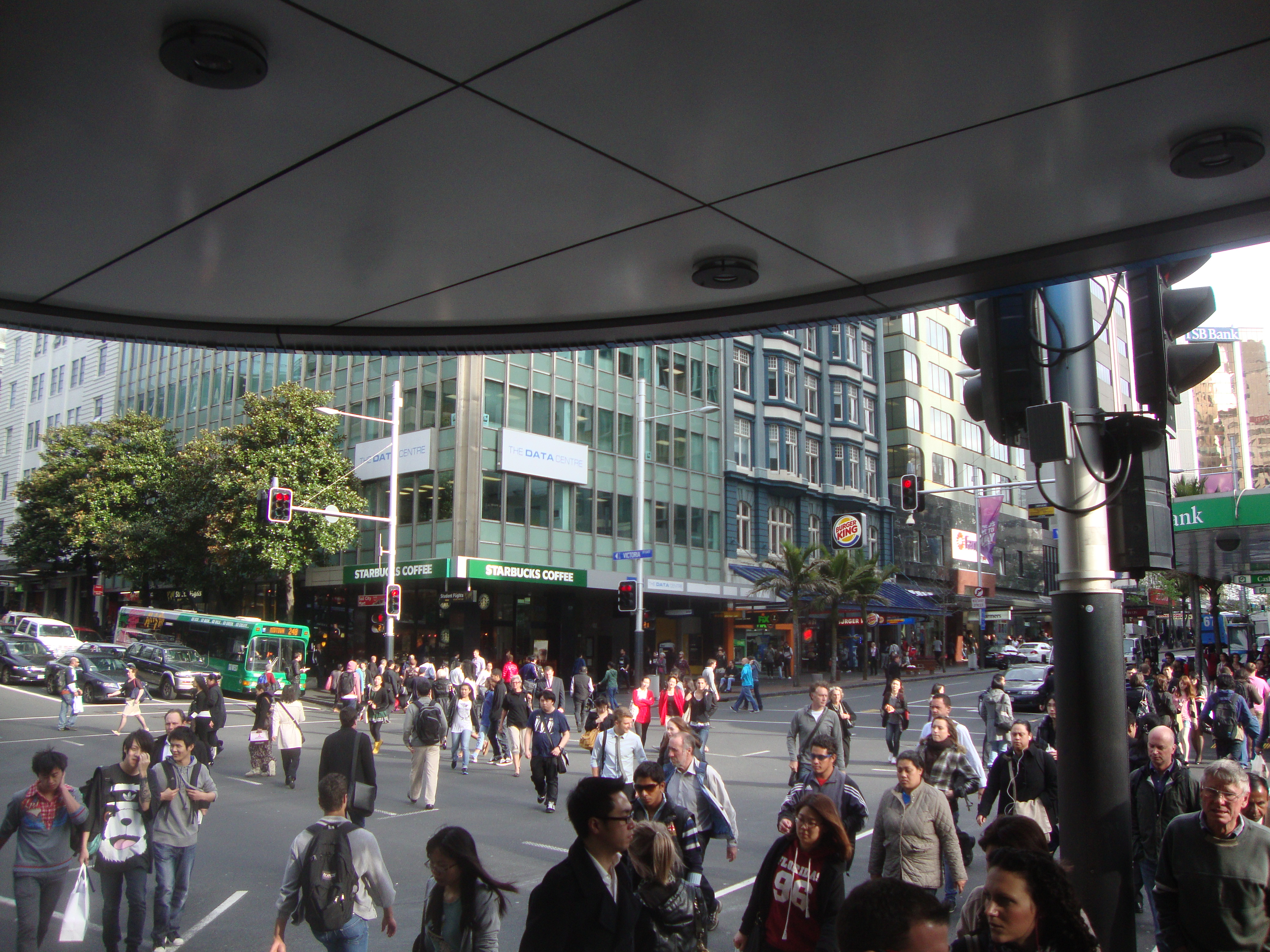
Intersection of Victoria Street and Queen Street

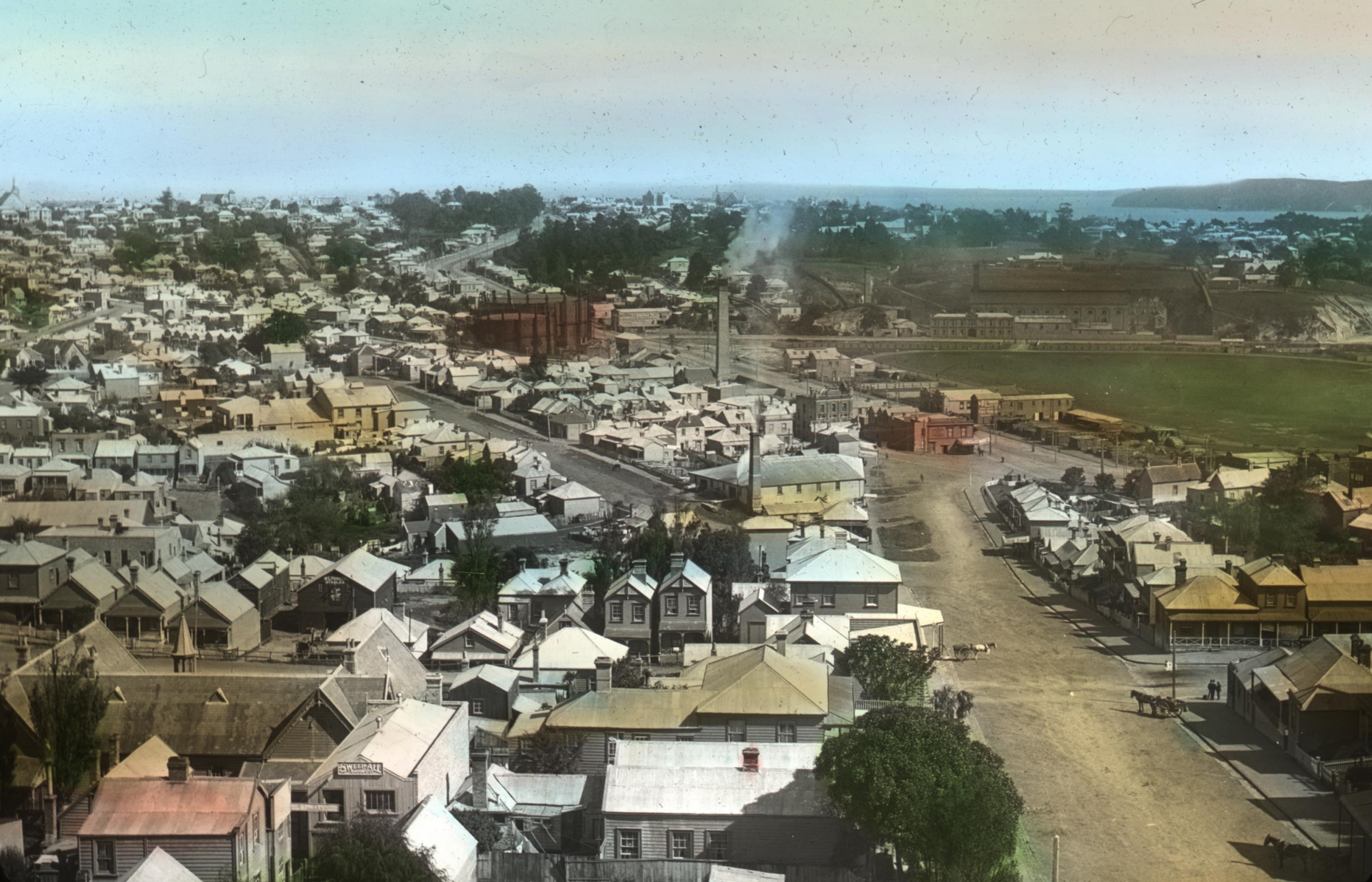
Victoria Park Market and Victoria Park in the early 20th century
