= Victoria Park Tunnel =

Vehicle tunnel in Auckland, New Zealand

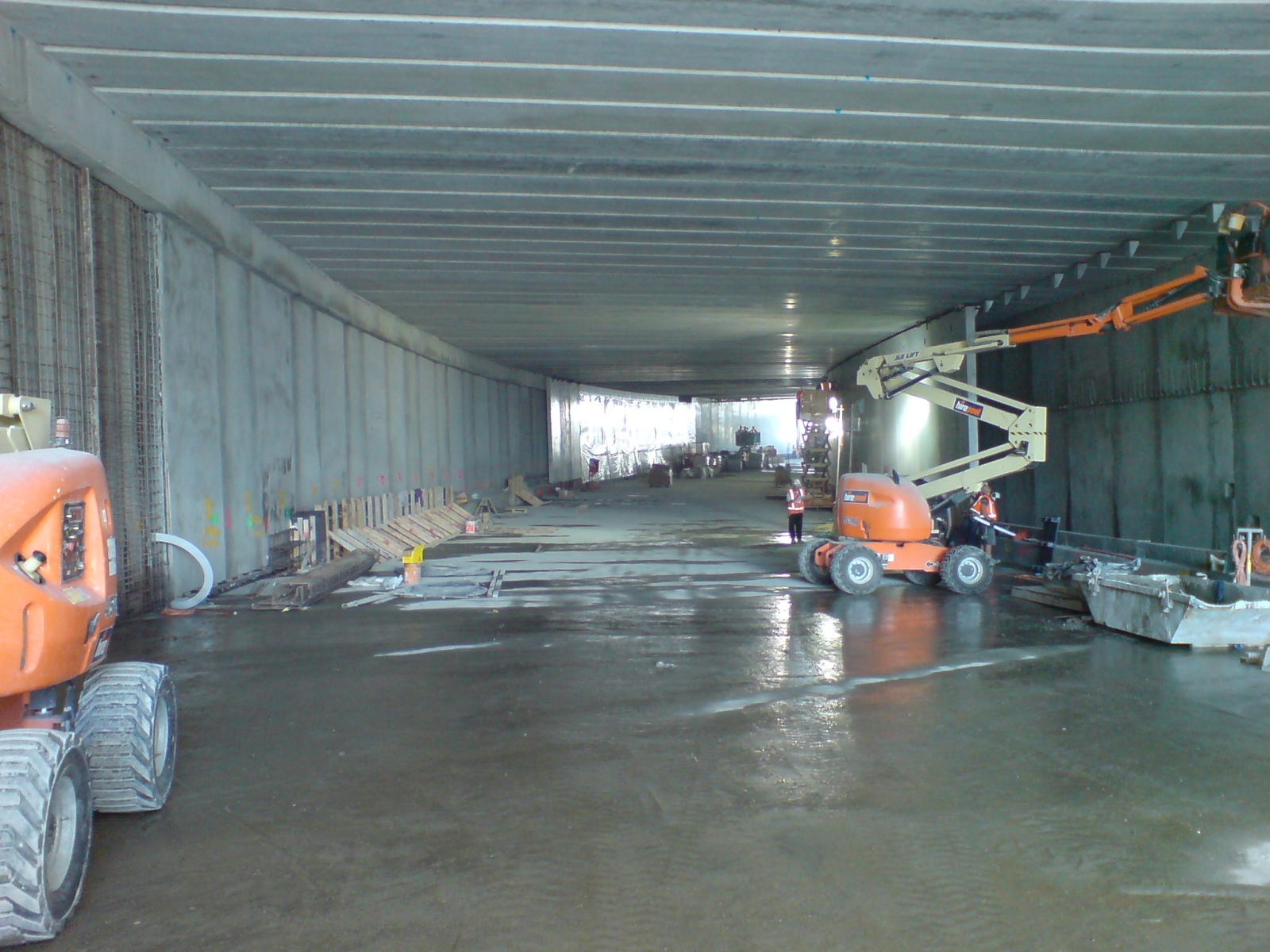
- The tunnel under construction in 2011

Overview
- Official name: Victoria Park Tunnel
- Other name: Vic Tunnel
- Location: Victoria Park, Freemans Bay, Auckland, New Zealand
- Coordinates: 36.847045°S 174.753095°E
- Status: Open to all traffic
- Route: Auckland Northern Motorway

Operation
- Work began: January 2010
- Opened: November 7, 2011
- Owner: AT (Auckland Transport)

Technical
- Length: 440 metres (1,440 ft)
- No. of lanes: 3
- Operating speed: 80 km/h (50 mph)
- Width: 13.2 m (43 ft)

The Victoria Park Tunnel is a motorway tunnel completed in 2012 on New Zealand State Highway 1 in Auckland, New Zealand, taking northbound traffic off the Victoria Park Viaduct, which was converted to all southbound traffic. It lies mostly under Victoria Park.

== Planning history ==
The new tunnel has reduced congestion on the Victoria Park section of State Highway 1, at the Victoria Park Viaduct, an area where delays are becoming more common even between morning and afternoon rush hours. By providing more capacity, it helps ensure that the Auckland Harbour Bridge can be used to its full capacity. Originally called the 'Harbour Bridge to City' project, the official name has now become 'Vic Park Tunnel'.

The tunnel, to initially cost approximately NZ$440 million (2009 estimate), later corrected down to $340 million, is a northbound-traffic carrying structure only, entering the ground in the area of the existing 'Birdcage' heritage pub (which will be relocated to allow the tunnel portal to be built in the area), and reemerges to the northwest of the park where it feeds into additional lanes provided alongside the St Marys Bay stretch of the motorway. The tunnel provides three lanes of traffic, and is 440 m long. Construction was originally to last four years, starting in January 2010, after the new National government fast-tracked further state highways investment.

=== Full undergrounding option ===
A future option to also bury the traffic lanes of the remaining southbound viaduct at a later stage was not ruled out. It was initially desired by the local stakeholders but did not go forward, even though the estimates for a replacement of the existing viaduct with a second/wider two-way tunnel envisaged costs of only 50% over the cost of a one-way structure (rather than a doubling of the cost). Transit has noted that the existing viaduct might remain in use for a further 30 years before being replaced with a two-way tunnel structure. Auckland City and Auckland Regional Council however continued to call for an earlier burial of the whole motorway. They have also called for the 'Rob Roy / Birdcage' pub (in the meantime bought by Transit) to be moved over the tunnel entry instead of beside it, to achieve a more attractive gateway and public space for the Freemans Bay community.

=== Interaction with harbour tunnels ===
The layout of any further traffic changes in the area will also be heavily affected by the plans for a possible second harbour crossing, which some plans see emerging at the Western Reclamation north of the tunnel, which is itself being replanned as a new mixed use and public park area. In May 2008, Transit New Zealand decided to revisit parts of the already consented plans to ensure that the Vic Park Tunnel design would not conflict with future harbour-crossing tunnels which were now short-listed to possibly connect Auckland City's Spaghetti Junction to North Shore City and would likely start in the area or run through it. Critics have however raised the question of whether the project should still go ahead when a second harbour crossing might eventually remove the need for the capacity extension that the Vic Park Tunnel is to provide.

=== Construction ===
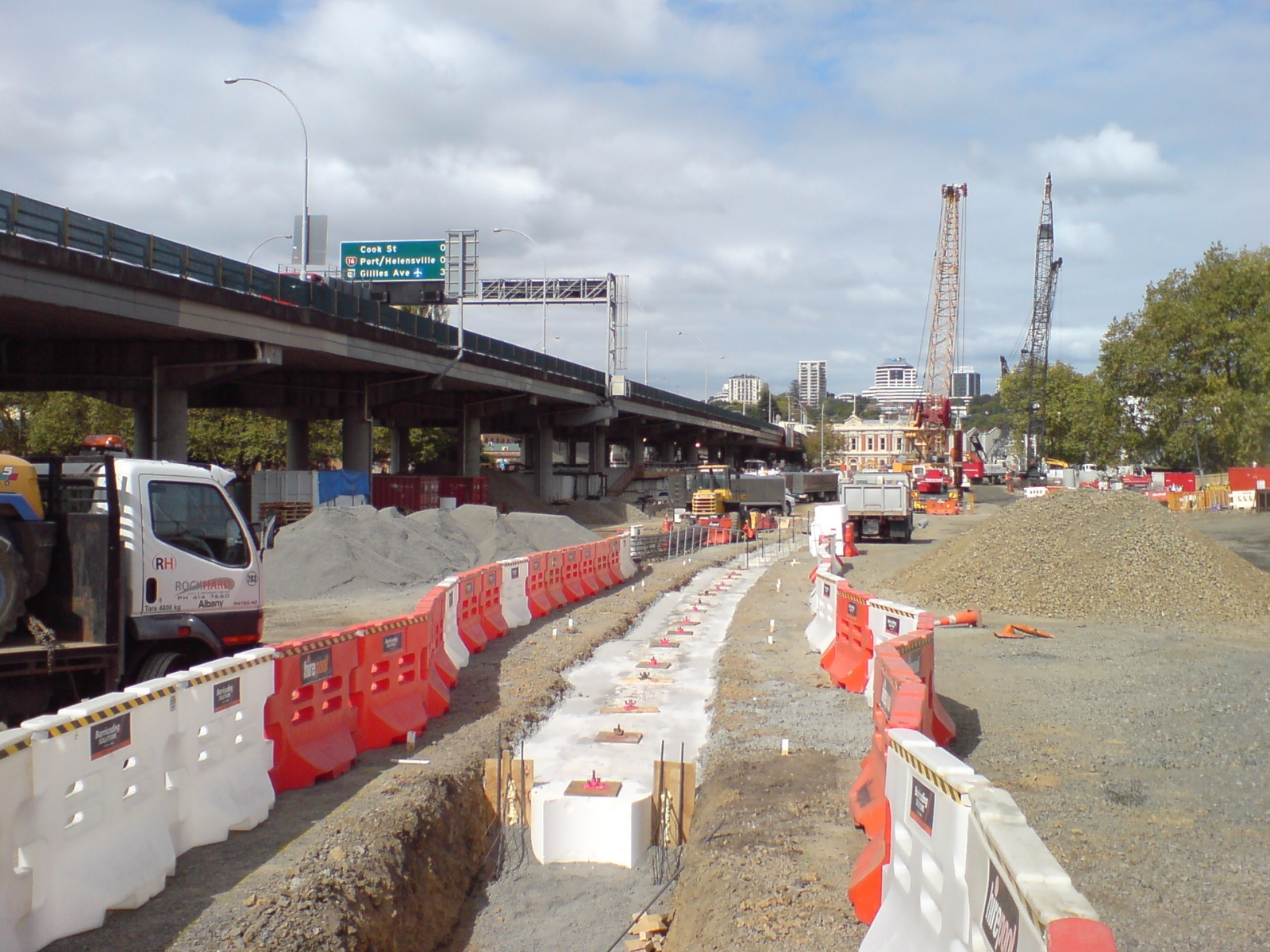
Constructing the tunnel walls in 2011 - the tops of the piles on one wall are visible, with the tunnel yet to be covered and then dug out underneath the new roof.

In early 2010 preparatory work began near the St Mary's Bay onramp. NZTA announced that the Birdcage hotel (sitting over the site of the future tunnel portal) would be shifted 40m away temporarily - eventually returning to almost the same site as before, and to become integrated into a new plaza space.

In July 2010, NZTA announced that all services (pipes and cables) in the path of the tunnel had been successfully relocated, freeing up the construction zone up for all further works (works not hindered by such services have been proceeding for some time, and construction of the tunnel walls was to finish around middle of July).

Around 160,000 m3 of soil will be removed in the 700m long tunnel trench, with over 100,000 man hours of work/month invested in the project, believed to be the highest of any [New Zealand] roading project. The project is expected to continue until mid-2012, though it is hoped that the general structure of the tunnel, and all work requiring impact on local streets can be completed by the Rugby World Cup 2011.

The Rob Roy Hotel was shifted into its temporary position at the end of August 2010, jacked up on sliding teflon rails and moved in a two-day exercise jokingly referred to as the "slowest pub crawl ever". It will eventually return to be relocated above the tunnel portal.

As part of the works, the Wellington Street on-ramp already had to be closed for a period of several weeks at one time, and is to be closed for several months later in 2011, for the construction of the tunnel approaches and the permanent on-ramp.

In mid-2011, it was announced that the project was ahead of schedule, with traffic being able to use the tunnel as early as November 2011, and all works intended to be completed by February 2012. In early July 2011, construction (but not fit-out) works were finished in the tunnel.

=== Ancillary works ===
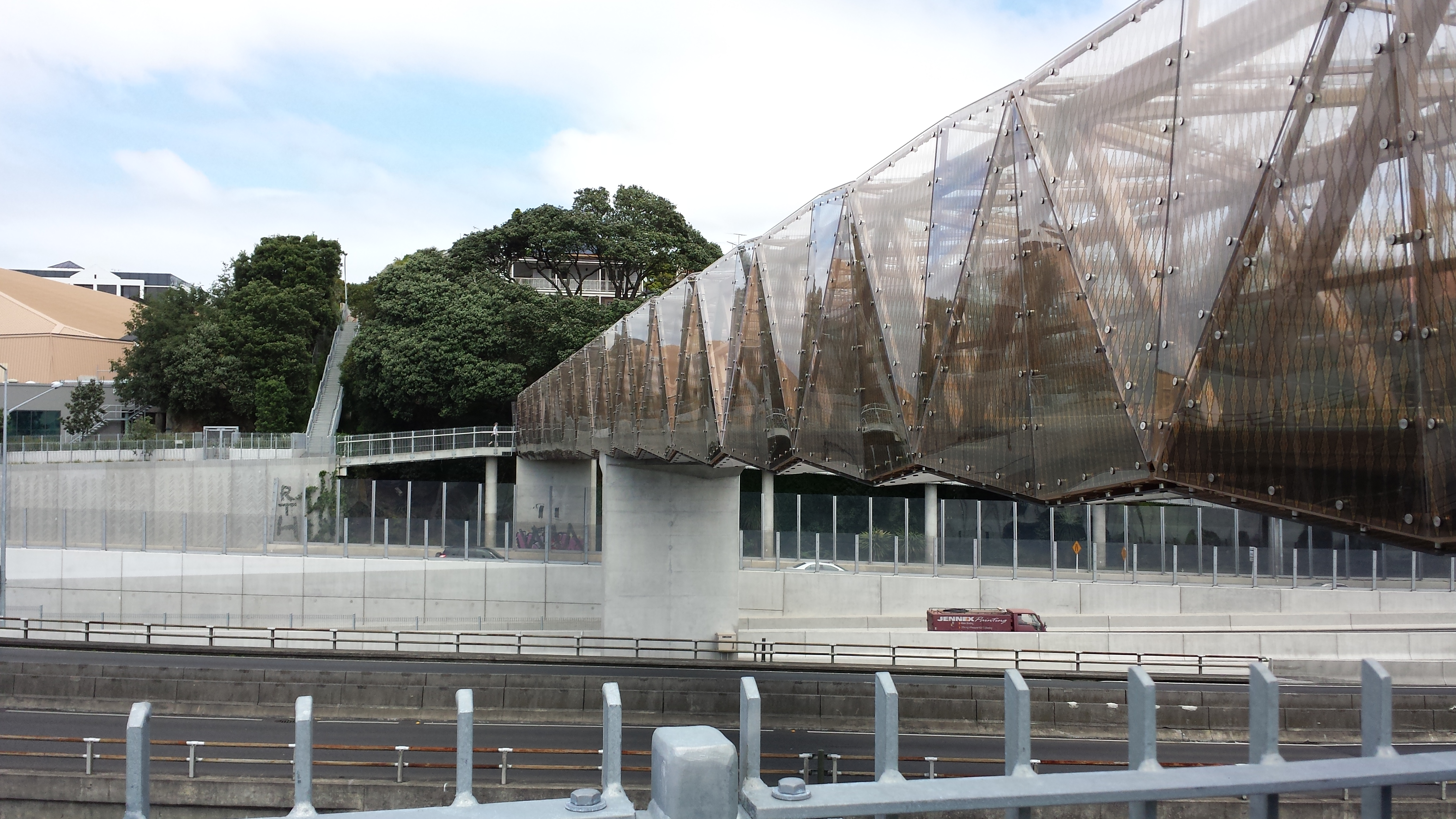
Jacobs Ladder Bridge.

As part of the tunnel works, additional lanes were constructed between the tunnel and the Auckland Harbour Bridge. These works included the construction of new noise barriers of 3-5m height, made of transparent panels, allowing intervisibility between the motorway and the Saint Marys Bay cliffs.

The works at the northern end of the tunnel will including a pedestrian bridge over the widened State Highway 1 connecting the eastern end of Westhaven Marina and the Western Reclamation with the 'Jacob's Ladder' stairway linking to St Mary's Bay. A number of non-motorway related works will be included in the project, such as restoration work to several heritage buildings in the construction zone, and upgrades to public spaces. In mid-2011, the project team started the construction work to replace a large Skatepark next to Beaumont Street that had had to be demolished during the work on the tunnel underneath.

The construction works also made a small number of archeological finds, including a 19th-century dual-trigger pistol, and various remains of old wharves and retaining walls thought to have been used in the land reclamation works that created Victoria Park.
