= Victoria Park, Auckland =

Park in Auckland, New Zealand

Victoria Park
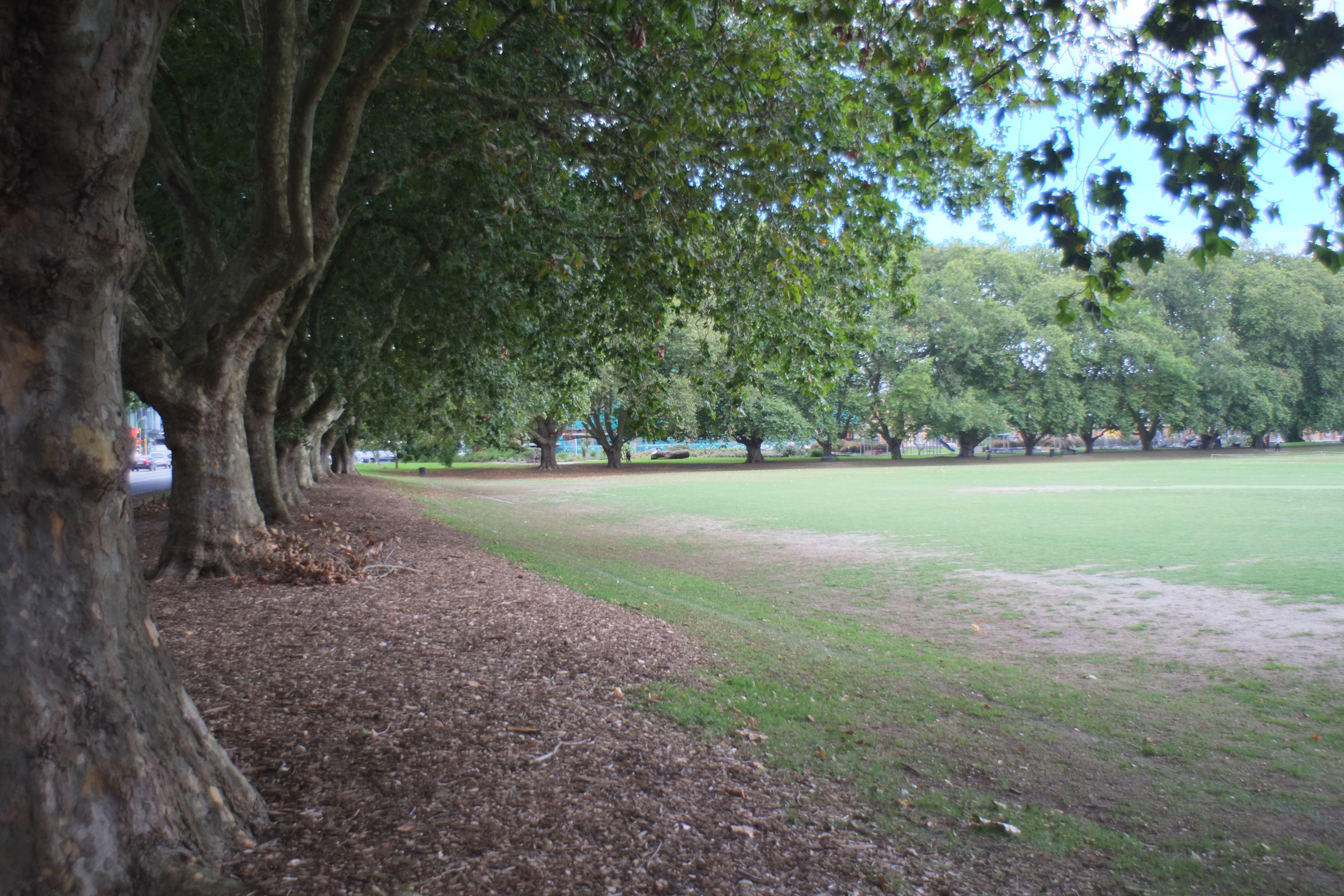
- Victoria Park, as seen from the northeast.
- Interactive map of Victoria Park
- Location: Auckland Central, Auckland, New Zealand
- Coordinates: 36.84690°S 174.75475°E
- Created: December 1905
- Operator: Auckland Council

Victoria Park is a park and sports ground in the Auckland city centre, New Zealand. It was opened in 1905 and named after the queen who had died four years earlier. It lies on reclaimed bay land in Freemans Bay, a suburb directly west of the Auckland CBD. However, it does not have direct connection to the foreshore anymore, as the Western Reclamation and the Viaduct Basin quarter lie between it and the Waitematā Harbour. The bay started to be filled in as early as the 1870s although the bulk of the reclamation appears to have happened after 1901. The Park was 'finished' around 1912, the area to the north (called the Western Reclamation) dates from after that.

== History ==
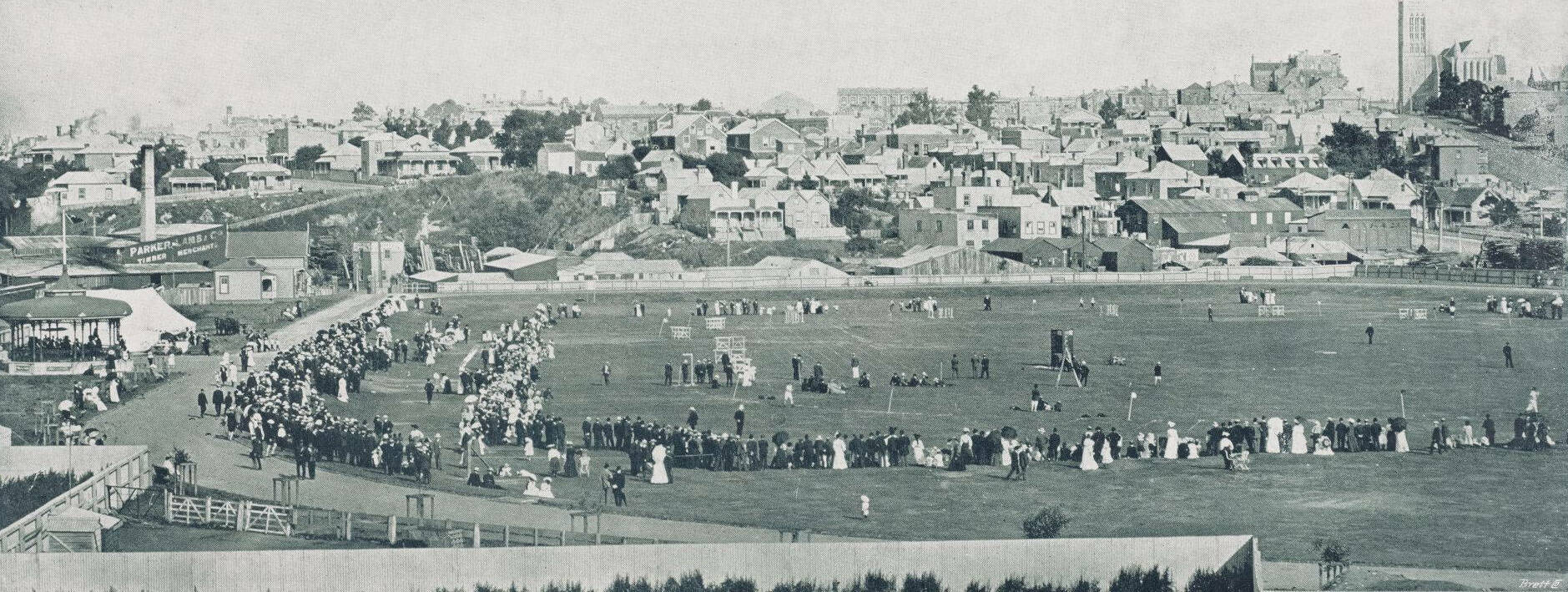
View of Victoria Park in 1907

A park located west of the Auckland central city was mooted at a Council meeting in 1884. Victoria Park opened in 1905 by mayor Arthur Myers, after the reclamation of Freemans Bay was completed. The artificial creation of the land is why it is very flat and level – it was intended from the start to be primarily a facility for active events augmenting the other public parks; Western Park 1876 and Albert Park 1884 which were for more genteel passive enjoyment. For this reason the park was not laid out in a picturesque manner, neither has it ever had decorative flower beds. The first grandstand pavilion was opened in 1906. As a sports facility for the adjacent working class areas and industrial zones it was provided with a sports pavilion and edged with trees to give shade for spectators. These are London plane trees (planted in 1905 for the opening of the park),

In 1910 'Campbell Free Kindergarten' opens in the western part of the park, with funds from Sir Logan Campbell and Lady Campbell. This building was later used by a sports club, and is owned by Auckland City Council, but fell into disrepair and has not had a tenant for two decades as of 2010, crumbling aways slowly. However, in June 2010 it was announced that NZ Transport Agency and Council had reached an agreement whereby some Vic Park Tunnel control equipment would be housed in a refurbished building provided as a legacy feature, with a 100-people occupancy community space on the ground floor. In 1912 the playground received equipment donated by John Court. Court owned a major Department Store on Queen Street and made many contributions to Auckland, including presenting the Zoo with an elephant.

Victoria Park was the site of the first ever match of international rugby league played on New Zealand soil when Great Britain played against the New Zealand Maori team on 20 July 1910 as part of their first ever tour of Australasia.

During the 1918 flu pandemic the park was used as an open air depot for the storage of the bodies of the many hundreds who died. The Pavilion was used as a temporary morgue. From here the bodies were transported to the Railway Station at the bottom of Queen Street and sent on to Waikumete Cemetery in West Auckland where they were interred in a series of mass graves. During the Second World War, the park was used for accommodation of US Armed Forces and covered with temporary huts. In the early 1950s, the park escaped closure and industrial redevelopment after it was decided that the facility was of regional use and the provision of parks in the outer suburbs would not suffice to replace it.

In 1960, the kindergarten moved to Tahuna Street, and the vacated building was occupied jointly by Grafton United Cricket Club, Ponsonby Soccer Club and the Pipe Band. The building was later abandoned (around the 1980s, by the late 2000s the building was derelict – now renovated in 2011). In 1962, the four-lane Victoria Park Viaduct was constructed overtop of the park, as a part of the Auckland North Motorway. Later plans to widen the viaduct (which by now is the narrowest part of the motorway in the Auckland area) meet resistance, as it is feared that this would further despoil the park it bisects.

In 1989 Auckland City receives ownership of Victoria Park from the Auckland Harbour Board, exchanging it for stub roads used for wharf access in Viaduct Basin.

In 1999, the Victoria Park Skate Park was constructed. As a part of this work, two pouwhenua were carved and incorporated into the park, in order to reflect Ngāti Whātua's associations with the area, and to improve the visual appeal of the skate park. The first Waiatarau, was carved by Lenard Phillips and Te Aroha Witika of Ngāti Whātua, acknowledges the former Waiatarau Stream. The second, Te Mau Mahara, was carved by skateboarder Lee Ralph (Te Rarawa), and depicts a figure holding a skateboard.

By the early 2000s, the four-lane viaduct had become a major bottleneck. The Victoria Park Tunnel was constructed in 2012, largely under the park, to provide a further three lanes. There is also talk of a future tunnel from a second harbour crossing underneath the Tank Farm possibly joining the motorway near the southern side of the park.

== Sports clubs ==
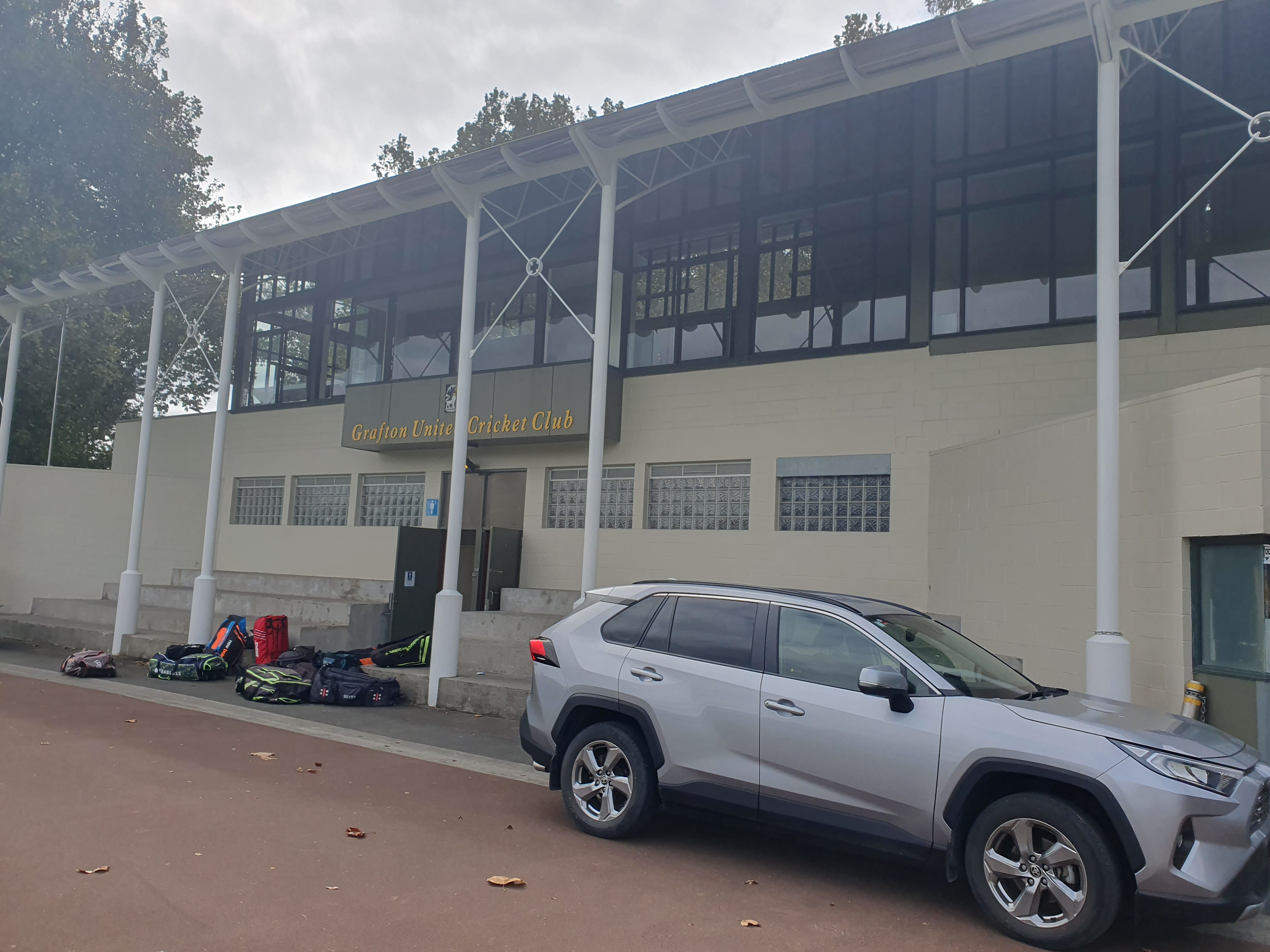
The Grafton United Cricket Club building

Victoria Park has been the home ground of the Ponsonby Ponies rugby league club since their foundation in 1908. In 1909 Asphalt tennis courts were created followed by bowling greens, croquet lawns and a playground added later. In 1907 and 1911 and 1911 the park was also extended both west and east. The park is home to multiple clubs, including the Grafton United Cricket Club, Ponsonby Soccer Club and the Pipe Band.

In 1993 the Victoria Park Sports and Cultural Trust was formed. The trust oversees the use of the cricket pavilion. The VPS&CT is made up of trustees representing the users of the pavilion and the playing fields of Victoria Park, these include the Grafton United Cricket Club, the Auckland Football Referees Association and the Auckland and District Pipe Band.

== Features ==
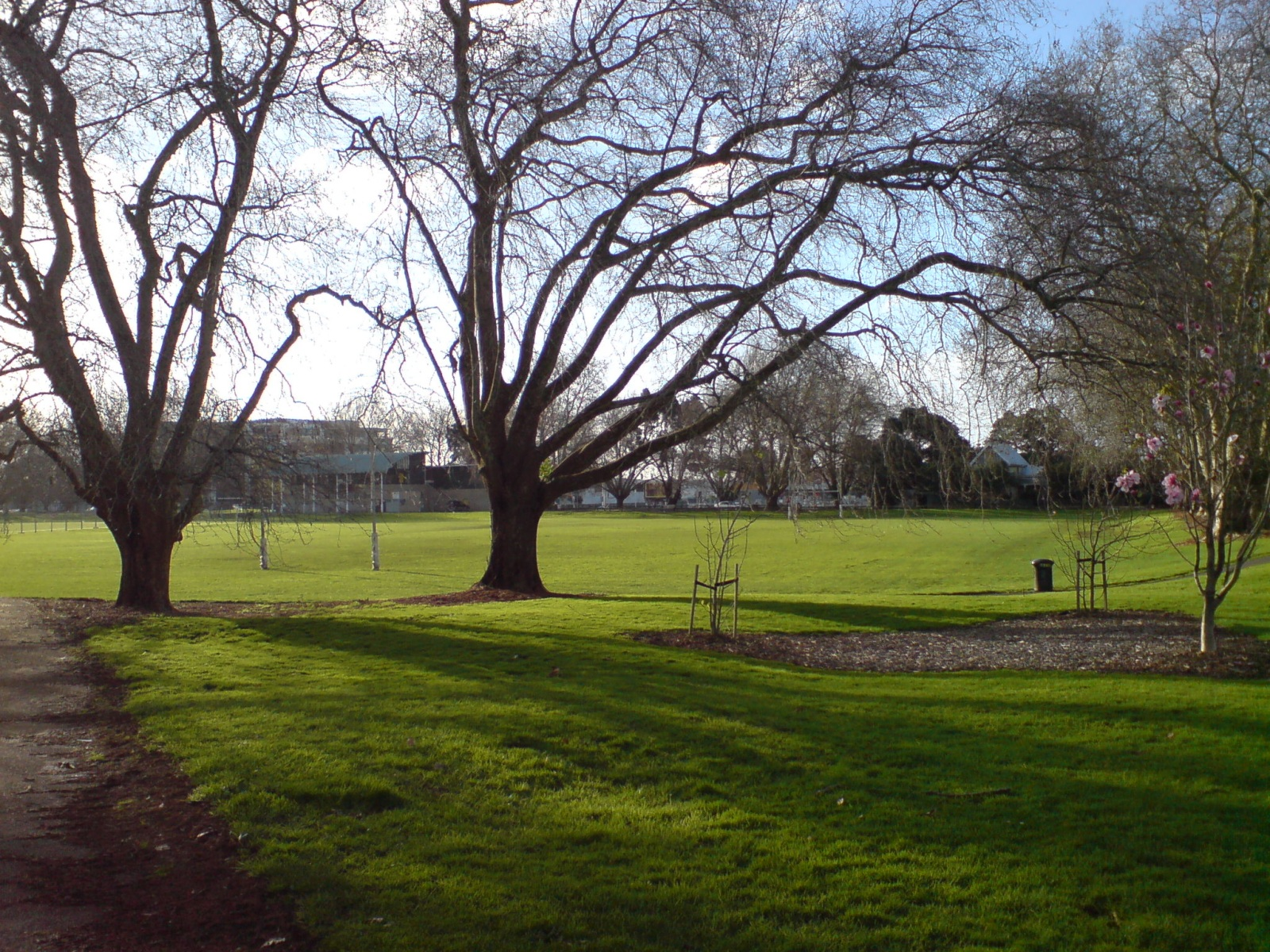
Victoria Park, seen from the southeast.

On the north side of the park was constructed a caretakers residence designed as an Arts & Crafts cottage (also recently restored as a cafe), a cricket pavilion (rebuilt in the 1990s) and a band rotunda (demolished before the Second War). As well as being home to cricket and rugby clubs, newer activities have found a place in the park; jogging for example. In the 1990s a skateboard park was created along with a petanque court.

On the south side space was also found a line of small commercial buildings facing towards the Municipal Incinerator (opened 1905). Next to these was built a Free Kindergarten – paid for by Sir John Logan Campbell, a former Mayor of Auckland; this building is the only survivor of the line of buildings which stood on the southern edge of the park and has been recently restored. Not far from the Kindergarten was created a playground for smaller children in 1912. The original equipment was imported from America and paid for by John Court the proprietor of a well known Queen Street department store. This facility has been recently renovated with up-to date modern equipment.

Major close by attractions are the Victoria Park Market, the former City rubbish incinerator (once known as the Destructor) built in 1905 and now housing an arts & crafts market and several entertainment venues. The market has received a major makeover, which has seen many of the older buildings of the complex restored (and some of the smaller stores merged for larger tenancies).

The portion to the east of the motorway is still directly connected with Victoria Park. It has changed substantially, with all the residential buildings long gone. Largely composed of industrial buildings which are now being replaced or retrofitted as residential accommodation, the Park will play an increasingly important role in the area. This eastern portion of Freemans Bay (centred on Victoria Street) has become relabeled as The Victoria Quarter while the area directly to the west of the park, technically part of St Mary's Bay is now becoming known as The Beaumont Quarter, the former Gas Works on Beaumont Street having been decontaminated and renovated as a residential development.

== Demographics ==
The statistical area of Victoria Park, which includes the commercial and high-density housing area east and southeast of the park, covers 0.45 km^{2} (0.17 sq mi) and had an estimated population of 3,530 as of June 2025, with a population density of 7,844 people per km^{2}.

Historical population
Year	Pop.	±% p.a.
2006	1,050	—
2013	1,374	+3.92%
2018	2,070	+8.54%
2023	3,099	+8.41%

Victoria Park had a population of 3,099 in the 2023 New Zealand census, an increase of 1,029 people (49.7%) since the 2018 census, and an increase of 1,725 people (125.5%) since the 2013 census. There were 1,551 males, 1,533 females and 15 people of other genders in 1,665 dwellings. 10.3% of people identified as LGBTIQ+. The median age was 30.9 years (compared with 38.1 years nationally). There were 210 people (6.8%) aged under 15 years, 1,221 (39.4%) aged 15 to 29, 1,566 (50.5%) aged 30 to 64, and 102 (3.3%) aged 65 or older.

People could identify as more than one ethnicity. The results were 35.4% European (Pākehā); 5.4% Māori; 3.8% Pasifika; 55.9% Asian; 5.7% Middle Eastern, Latin American and African New Zealanders (MELAA); and 1.3% other, which includes people giving their ethnicity as "New Zealander". English was spoken by 94.7%, Māori language by 1.5%, Samoan by 1.2%, and other languages by 49.3%. No language could be spoken by 1.5% (e.g. too young to talk). New Zealand Sign Language was known by 0.3%. The percentage of people born overseas was 69.0, compared with 28.8% nationally.

Religious affiliations were 22.5% Christian, 9.4% Hindu, 2.0% Islam, 0.4% Māori religious beliefs, 3.3% Buddhist, 0.6% New Age, 0.2% Jewish, and 2.0% other religions. People who answered that they had no religion were 54.3%, and 5.5% of people did not answer the census question.

Of those at least 15 years old, 1,524 (52.8%) people had a bachelor's or higher degree, 804 (27.8%) had a post-high school certificate or diploma, and 558 (19.3%) people exclusively held high school qualifications. The median income was $54,000, compared with $41,500 nationally. 540 people (18.7%) earned over $100,000 compared to 12.1% nationally. The employment status of those at least 15 was that 1,830 (63.3%) people were employed full-time, 306 (10.6%) were part-time, and 129 (4.5%) were unemployed.
