= Jacob's Ladder (disambiguation) =

Jacob's Ladder is a staircase to heaven from a dream of Jacob described in the Book of Genesis.

Jacob's Ladder may also refer to:

== Film and television ==
- Jacob's Ladder (1990 film), a horror film
- Jacob's Ladder (2019 film), a remake of the 1990 film
- "Jacob's Ladder", an episode of the television series Rectify

== Literature ==
- Jacob's Ladder (Oppenheim novel), 1921, by E. Phillips Oppenheim
- Jacob's Ladder, a 1950 novel by Marjorie Kinnan Rawlings
- Jacob's Ladder, a 1963 novel by Sheena Porter
- Jacob's Ladder, a 1998 novel by Donald McCaig
- Jacob's Ladder, a 2003 novel by Pauline Hunter Blair
- Jacob's Ladder, a 2003 autobiography by Colin Mackay
- Jacob's Ladder (Keaney novel), 2005, by Brian Keaney
- Jacob's Ladder (Yakov's Ladder), a 2015 novel by Lyudmila Ulitskaya

== Music ==
=== Songs ===
- "We Are Climbing Jacob's Ladder", a traditional African American slave spiritual
- "Jacob's Ladder", a 1965 adaptation of "We Are Climbing Jacob's Ladder" by the Staple Singers from Freedom Highway
- "Jacob's Ladder", a 1978 song by Cedar Walton from Animation
- "Jacob's Ladder" (Rush song) (1980)
- "Jacob's Ladder", a 1984 song by The Monochrome Set
- "Jacob's Ladder" (Huey Lewis and the News song) (1987)
- "Jacob's Ladder" (Mark Wills song) (1996)
- "Jacob's Ladder (Not in My Name)", a 2002 song by Chumbawamba
- "Jacob's Ladder", a 2003 song by Converge from Unloved and Weeded Out
- "Jacob's Ladder", a 2005 song by Chimp Spanner from Imperium Vorago
- "Jacob's Ladder", a 2005 song by Patrick Wolf from Wind in the Wires
- "Jacob's Ladder", a 2006 song by Fucked Up from Hidden World
- "Jacob's Ladder", a 2006 song by Bruce Springsteen and the Sessions Band from We Shall Overcome: The Seeger Sessions
- "Jacob's Ladder", a 2013 song by Terence Blanchard from Magnetic

=== Albums and other compositions ===
- Die Jakobsleiter, an early 1920s unfinished oratorio by Arnold Schoenberg
- Jacob's Ladder (the Filthy Tongues album)
- Jacob's Ladder (Brad Mehldau album)

== Places ==
=== Australia ===
- Jacob's Ladder, Brisbane, Queensland
- Jacob's Ladder, a road to the top of Ben Lomond, Tasmania
- Jacob's Ladder (Perth), Kings Park, Western Australia

=== New Zealand ===
- Jacobs Ladder Bridge, a bridge between Westhaven and Saint Marys Bay, in Auckland
- Jacob's Ladder, a public flight of steps in St Clair, Dunedin

=== United Kingdom and overseas territories ===
- Jacob's Ladder (Saint Helena), a Grade I listed staircase from Jamestown, Saint Helena, up Ladder Hill
- Jacob's Ladder, Derbyshire, a scenic path on Kinder Scout in the Peak District of England
- Jacob's Ladder, a set of steps and a beach in Sidmouth, Devon, England
- Jacob's Ladder, a scenic path in Cheddar Gorge in Somerset, England
- Jacob's Ladder, a set of stone steps at Devil's Bridge, Ceredigion, Wales
- Jacob's Ladder, a set of stone steps in Edinburgh, Scotland
- Jacob's Ladder, a flight of granite steps in Falmouth, Cornwall
- Jacob's Ladder, a stone staircase in Ramsgate, Kent linking the cliff top to the harbour
- Jacob's Ladder, a concrete staircase in Aberdeen, Scotland providing access to Grandholm Bridge & Grandholm Mill from Woodside, Aberdeen

=== United States ===
- Jacob's Ladder, a section of U.S. Route 20 as it crosses the Berkshire Hills between the towns of Chester and Lee in western Massachusetts
- Jacob's Ladder Trail, a hiking trail to Lone Peak in Utah's Wasatch Range

== Other uses ==
- Jacob's ladder (electrical), a device for producing high-voltage traveling arcs
- Jacobs Ladder (exercise machine), a self-paced climbing machine
- Jacob's ladder (flower), a genus of flowering plants
- Jacob's ladder (knife), a three-part pocket knife
- Jacob's Ladder (Moskos), a tempera painting by Elias Moskos
- Jacob's ladder (nautical), specialized ladders used at sea
- Jacob's ladder (toy), a folk toy consisting of blocks on strings that, when held at one end, appear to cascade down the strings
- Jacob's ladder surface, a noncompact surface in mathematics
- Jacob's ladder, the European name for a solo string figure
- Crepuscular rays or Jacob's Ladder, rays of sunlight that appear to radiate from a point in the sky
- Frenum ladder or Jacob's ladder, a series of frenum piercings from the head to shaft of a penis

== See also ==
- Ladder of Jacob, a pseudepigraphic text of the Old Testament
