= Auckland Gas Company =

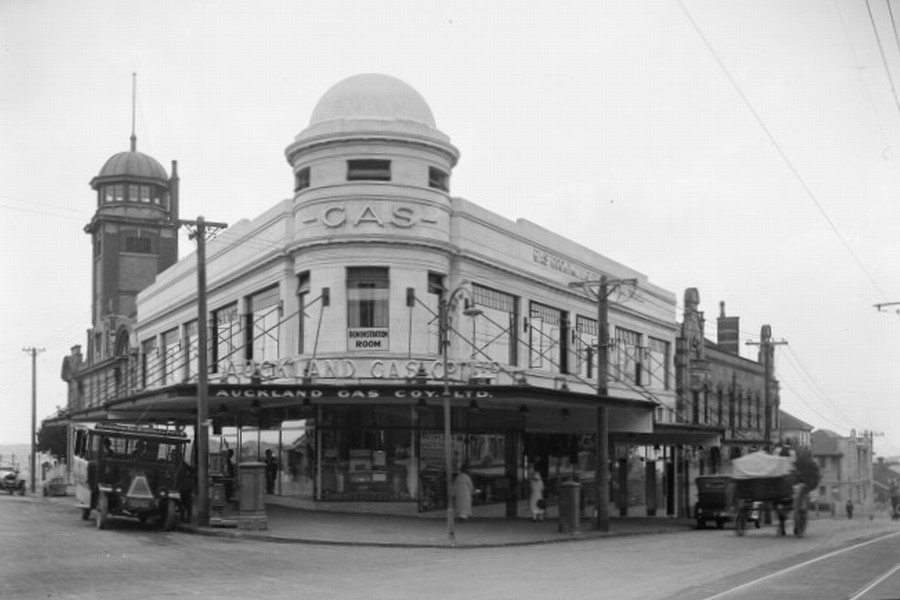
Company offices in the 1920s. The building on the corner of Beresford Street / Pitt Street still exists.

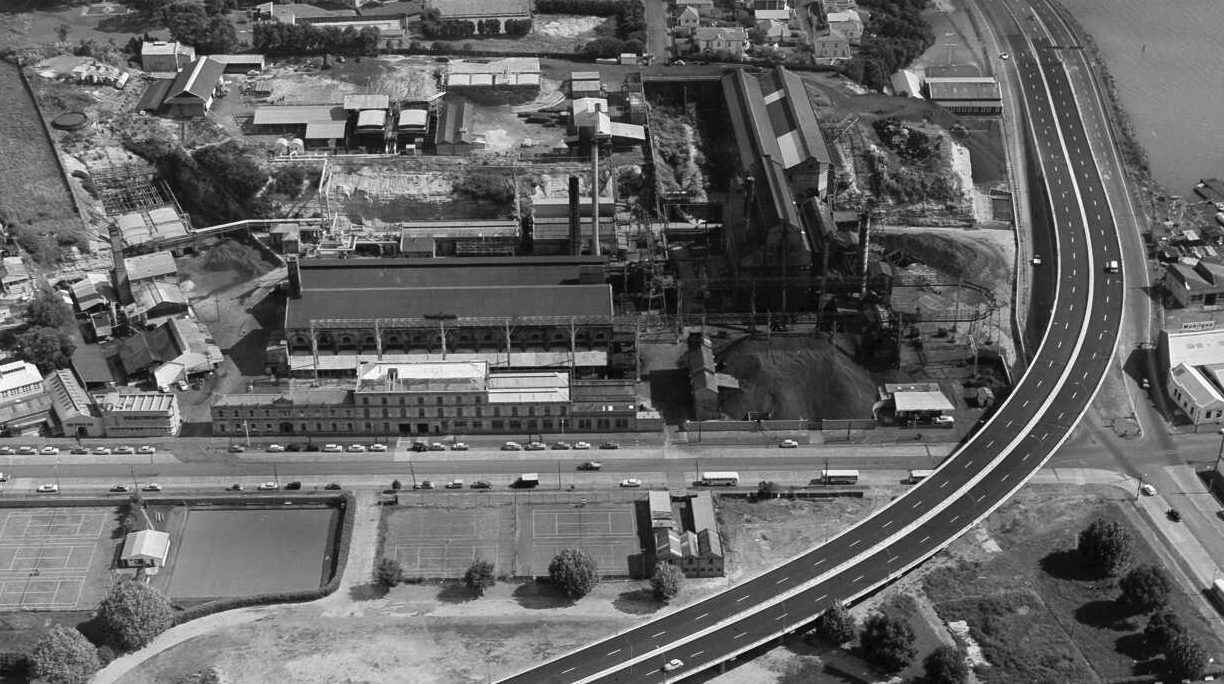
Gasworks, Beaumont Street, Freemans Bay by Victoria Park 1962

The Auckland Gas Company is a company providing gas for residential or commercial customers in the Auckland area, New Zealand. It is one of the oldest still existing brand names in New Zealand, having been established as Auckland Gas Company Ltd in 1862 or 1863. It is owned since 2004 by Nova Energy.

== History ==
The Auckland Gas Company was formed in 1862 as the first joint stock company in New Zealand. It was also the first private services provider in Auckland. In the 1870s, the company bought and developed a large site in Freemans Bay to build a gasworks (roughly on and east of the site of the former Victoria Street New World supermarket), with further buildings (mainly workshops) and offices on Beaumont Street.

In the late 1960s the Kapuni gas fields were opened, providing natural gas which was cleaner and cheaper than the locally produced coal gas variant, and the company stopped producing gas and became a supplier only. This led to most of the buildings in the Freemans Bay are being demolished.
