= Freemans Bay =

- Suburb
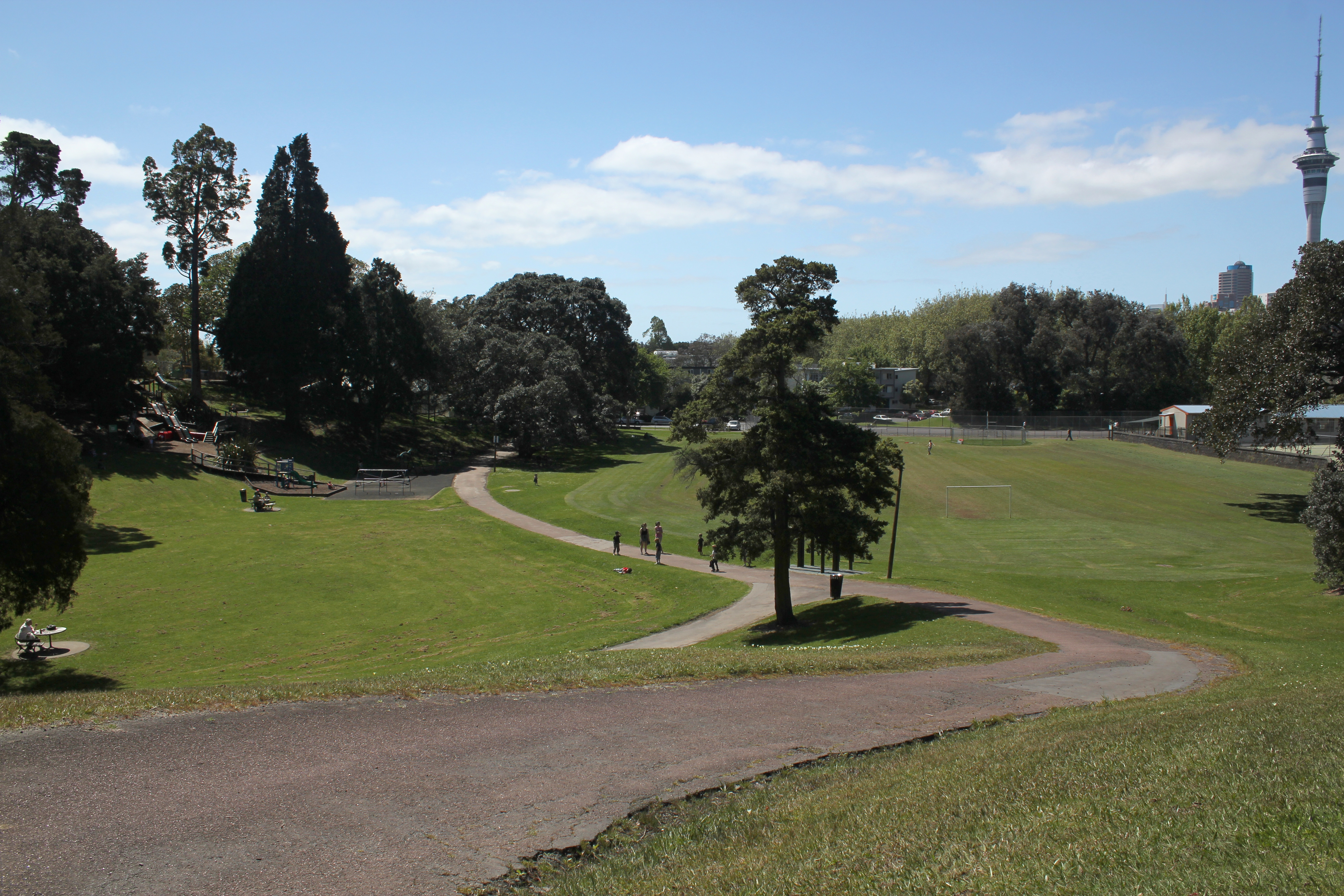
- Interactive map of Freemans Bay
- Coordinates: 36.85157°S 174.751024°E
- Country: New Zealand
- City: Auckland
- Local authority: Auckland Council
- Electoral ward: Waitematā and Gulf ward
- Local board: Waitematā Local Board
- Established: 1840s

Area
  - Land: 102 ha (250 acres)

Population (June 2025)
  - Total: 4,080
  - Density: 4,000/km^{2} (10,400/sq mi)

Saint Marys Bay	Wynyard Quarter	Viaduct Harbour
Ponsonby	Freemans Bay	Auckland CBD
Ponsonby	Newton	Auckland CBD

Freemans Bay is the name of a former bay and now inner city suburb of Auckland, in the North Island of New Zealand. The bay has been filled in to a considerable extent, with the reclamation area now totally concealing the ancient shoreline. Historically a poor and often disreputable quarter, it is now a comparatively wealthy and desirable neighbourhood known for its mix of heritage homes and more recent single-dwelling houses, as well as for its two large parks.

== Geography ==
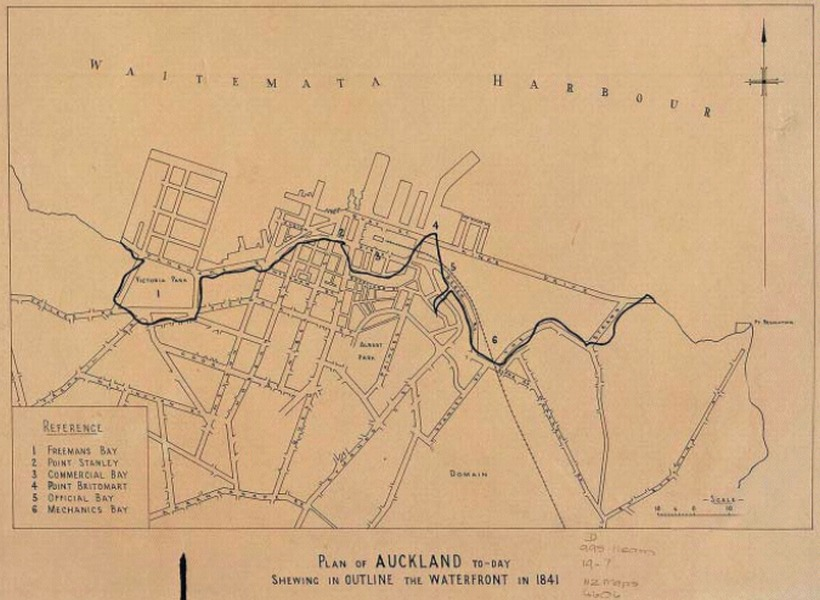
Waterfront in ca 1930, with the older coastline of 1841 also shown as a darker line. Freemans Bay to the left.

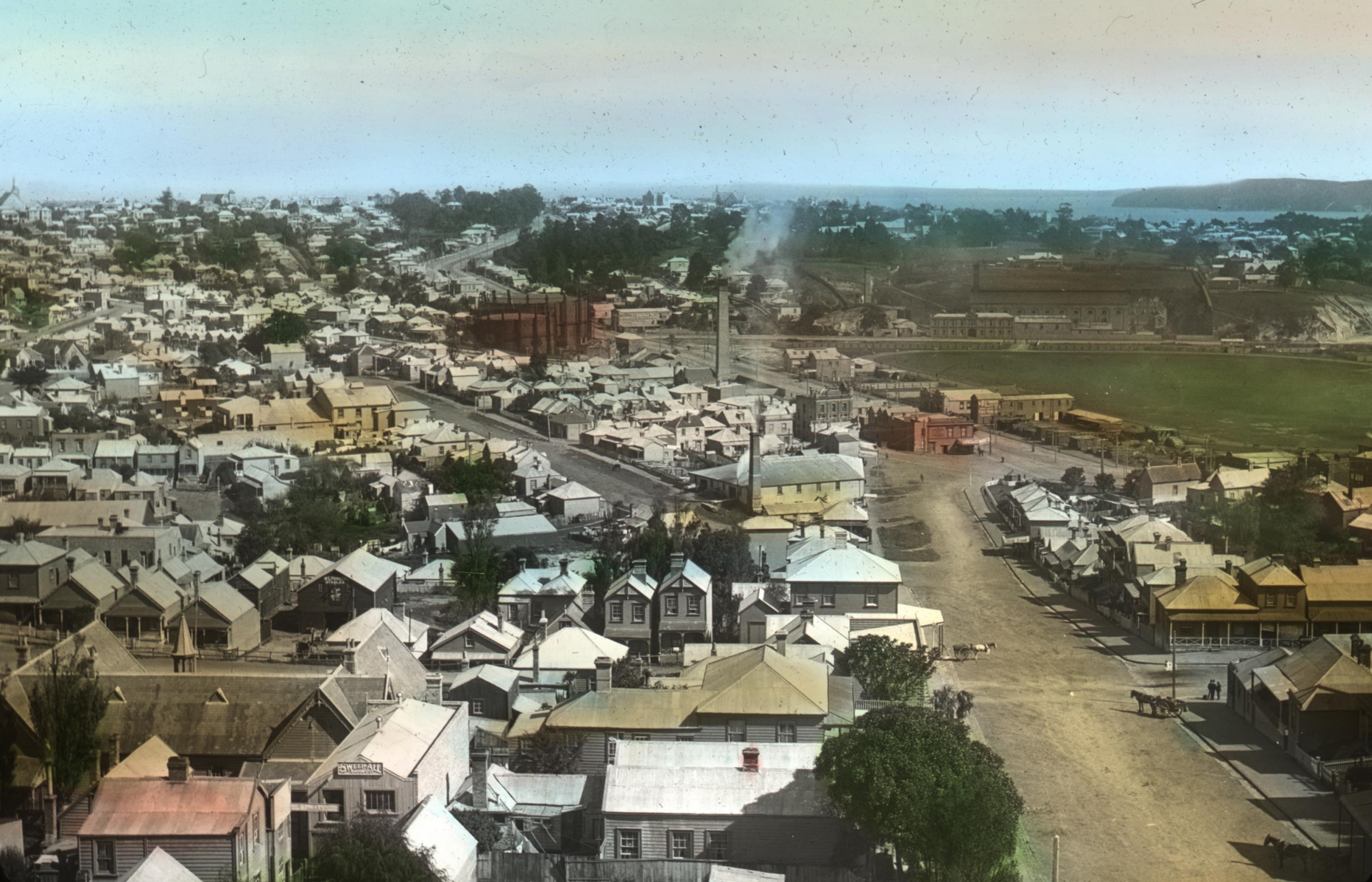
Lower Freemans Bay and Victoria Park, sometime in the early 20th century, looking west along Wellesley Street West.

Since the turn of the 20th century, extensive land reclamation (partly using stone quarried from nearby headlands) has seen Freemans Bay itself disappear. The reclamation of the old bay began in 1873 and was finished in 1901. Victoria Park was created on most of the resulting flat area. It is still public land used mostly for sports purposes.

The coastline shifted more than one kilometre to the northwest of the city centre and is now composed of the concrete wharves of Viaduct Basin and the Tank Farm or as it is now renamed, the Wynyard Quarter.

== History ==
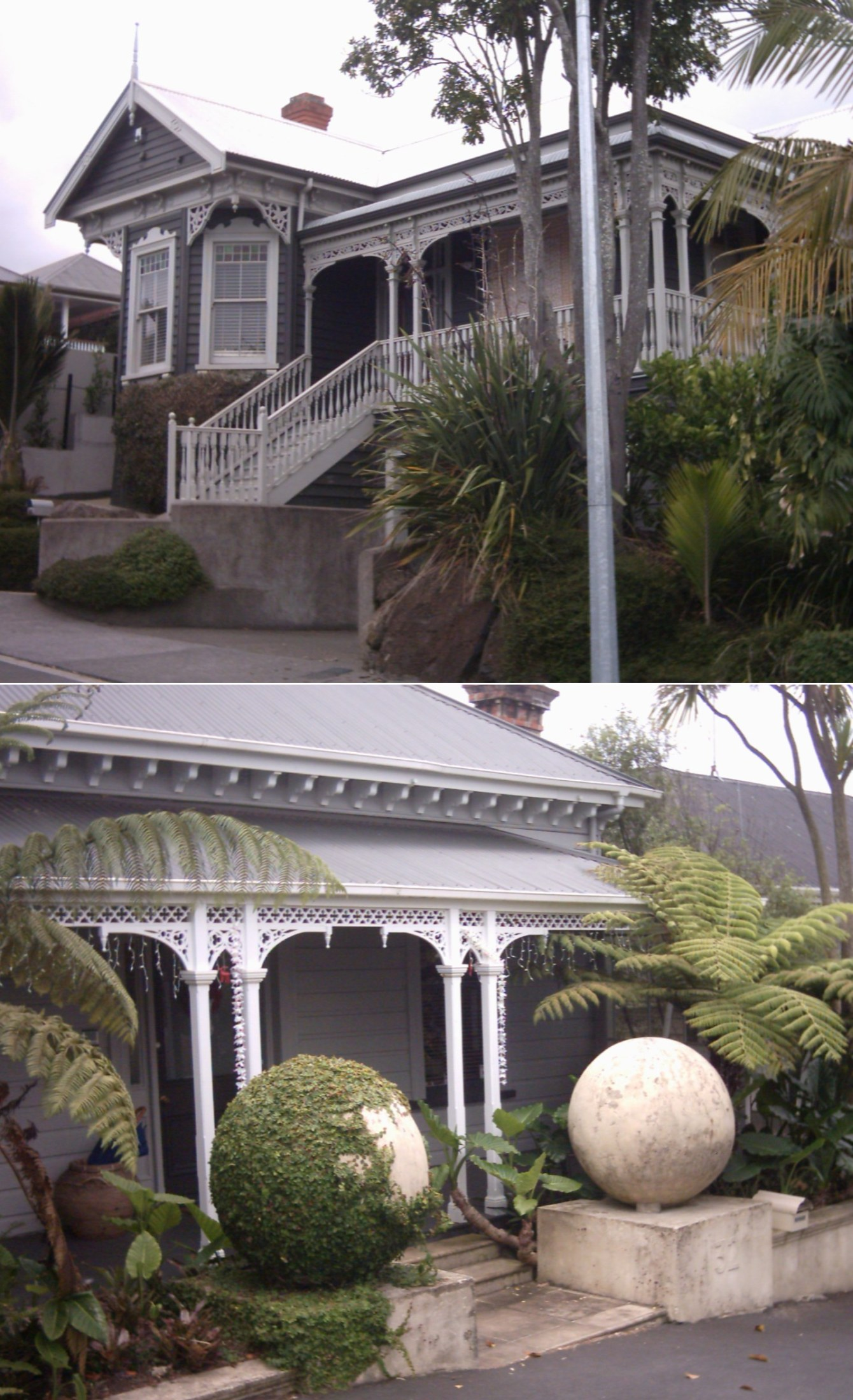
Heritage houses in Freemans Bay.

=== Māori history ===
Waiatarau (or 'Reflecting Waters') was the Māori name for the bay that is now Victoria Park, although other names were used to refer to the area; such as Wai Kōtota ('The place where the cockles are harvested') and Te Koranga ('The scaffolds', referring to the racks upon which fish would be hung to dry in the sun). A stream called Waikuta ('Waters of the reed') discharged into the south eastern corner of the bay (bottom of College Hill Road) while the Tunamau ('To catch eels') stream came down from what is now Western Park and met the bay at the bottom of what is now Franklin Road. The headland at the western side of the bay was called Te Tō, and was a seasonal fishing pā used by Tāmaki Māori. Te Tō was occupied by 18th century Waiohua paramount chief Kiwi Tāmaki during the shark hunting season on the Waitematā Harbour.

=== European settlement ===
Freemans Bay is one of the earliest settled areas in Auckland, and was earmarked for development and land reclamation in the 1840s by Colonial Surveyor Felton Mathew who laid out the streets along the shores of the local bays. During the early colonial era, the bay was known by Māori as Waipiro Bay, due to the large amounts of rum consumed there.

Freemans Bay is probably named after Captain William Hobson's secretary, James Stuart Freeman who apparently lived in the area.

While it was one of the earliest settled parts of the country by Europeans, the area was never seen as a desirable place to live. The rich favoured the other side of Queen Street, clustering around the governor's mansion (where the university is now located) and enjoying views of the harbour and Rangitoto, this was even referred to as the 'right side' of Queen Street.

On the "wrong side of Queen Street" were located most of the smelly and noisy industries including the abattoir and the gasworks of the Auckland Gas Company. As well as brickworks, by 1883 the area was the location of nine shipyards, three sawmills, a brass and iron foundry, a glassworks, an asphalt works, as well as several coal and lime traders. Also found here were several public facilities like the city morgue, a night soil dump and from 1905 the city rubbish incinerator (known as the 'Destructor', which became Victoria Park Market and was rebranded as Victoria Park Village in 2017).

Around these occupations were gathered some of the more modest houses in 19th century Auckland. Two land auctions in 1864 in this area were the "Brookville" estate (121 sites) and "Alma Place" (152 sites). The large number of building sites are probably an indication of the very small size of the building sections. These workers cottages were built very close together and often poorly constructed, sometimes being little better than hovels with dirt floors. Not all the housing in the area was so modest, however; on Franklin Road, which rises up the hill towards the Ponsonby ridge, were built larger houses, including several two storied houses, and in 1873 the street was beautified by the City Council by planting it with plane trees. Many of these larger houses subsequently became boarding establishments for male workers from the adjacent industries.

In 1910 the average house for sale on Franklin Road was advertised for £736, while the average house in Victoria Road, Remuera, was considered worth £1279 at the time. In 1905 Victoria Park was created which included sports grounds, a sports pavilion and a children's playground. The playground equipment was donated by Mr John Court of the John Court Department Store. In 1909 a kindergarten for the local children was opened. It soon ran into financial problems, however, from which it was rescued by Dr John Logan Campbell. The brick building stood for many years unused, recently restored by Auckland Council and NZTA as part of the works around the Victoria Park Tunnel. During the 1918 flu epidemic, the sports pavilion was used as a depot for corpses awaiting transportation by rail to the city cemeteries.

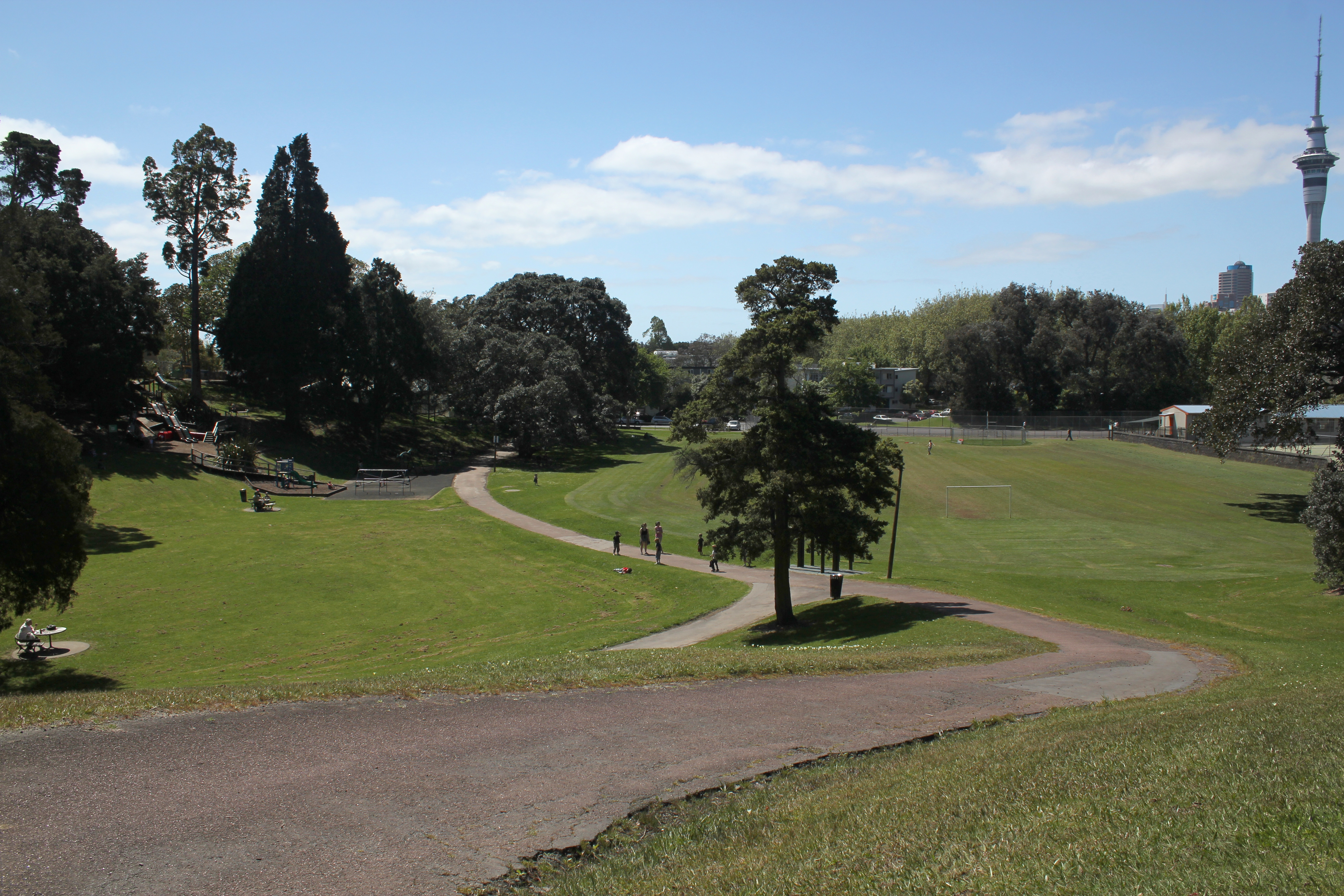
Lower Western Park.

As a working class area, Freemans Bay was greatly affected by the Great Depression. By 1930, the percentage of unskilled workers amongst the male population of Freemans Bay had risen to 39%, whereas in affluent Remuera it was only 2%. Conversely, only 11% of all males of Freemans Bay worked in "white-collar" or "business and professional" roles, whereas in Remuera the same percentage had grown to 86% by that time, a sign of the increasing homogenisation of Auckland suburbs.

Freemans Bay was seen as a centre of crime, prostitution, sedition and Union Activity. There were also concerns about it being a source of infectious diseases, including plague and tuberculosis. In the 1930s, the Auckland City Council set up a committee called "The Decadent Areas Committee" (later renamed as the "Housing Committee") largely to deal with the area. In the 1930s and 1940s, many Māori who moved into the city looking for work came to live in the cheap housing of the area. This pattern was repeated in the 1950s and 1960s when Pacific Islanders arrived in New Zealand seeking employment as well.

During the Second World War, Victoria Park was commandeered and covered with a military camp for the American Armed Forces. The adjacent areas St Mary's Bay and Freemans Bay became notorious as the location of many brothels along with illicit drinking and gambling establishments. Many of the women in the area were keen to have fun with the American troops who were known to be generous with money, cigarettes and nylon stockings. The distinction made by the authorities and most respectable people between a female being a 'loose woman' and being a prostitute was pretty vague. St Mary's Bay was known for being more expensive and tended to cater for the officers, while Freeman's Bay was for the lower end of the market. This reputation clung to the area after the war.

In 1951, the Auckland City Council declared a 96 hectare area of Freemans Bay as an area for urban development, and planned to replace the entire housing stock with medium-density housing, destroying the homes of over 7,000 people in the process. While this did not come to pass, several developments of flats and townhouses were built in the 1960s and 1970s, such as along Whitson Terrace. During the 1980s and 1990s, the remaining Victorian houses began to be gentrified along with the neighbouring suburbs of Ponsonby and St Marys Bay and they are now some of Auckland's most fashionable and desirable residences.

On Victoria Street opposite Victoria Park stands a group of brick Edwardian industrial buildings. Built between 1905 & 1915 and known as "the Destructor", this facility generated electricity by burning the city's rubbish. Opened by the Mayor Arthur Myers, this facility was closed in 1972, and in 1983 it was converted into a market called Victoria Park Market, latterly rebranded as Victoria Park Village.

Behind Victoria Park Village is the Drake hotel which sits at a slightly higher level than the Village, Victoria Street and the park. This shows the outline of the ancient sea cliff. From 1905 onwards, Freemans Bay was filled in to create the park. After 1919 the reclamations continued and the area north of the park was created to provide more wharf area for the expanding Ports of Auckland. This included the Lighter Basin to the east and Wynyard Wharf to the west.

From 2000 to 2003, the Lighter Basin was redeveloped as the Viaduct Basin, which served as a headquarters for the various yachting syndicates involved in the America's Cup campaigns of 2000 and 2003. The area is now an upper-class (multi-story) residential area. On the adjacent Fanshawe Street, previously dilapidated warehouses have been replaced by new prestigious office blocks, including Vodafone New Zealand. The Wynyard Quarter is also undergoing a great deal of redevelopment, which includes the new Silo Park.

The suburb is now home to a much more affluent populace, with the 2006 median income at $41,400, much higher than the $26,800 average Auckland-wide. Around 32% of all residents live in single-person households, some in the many former Council and State Housing flats still existing in the area, though the housing stock is varied.

== Notable buildings ==
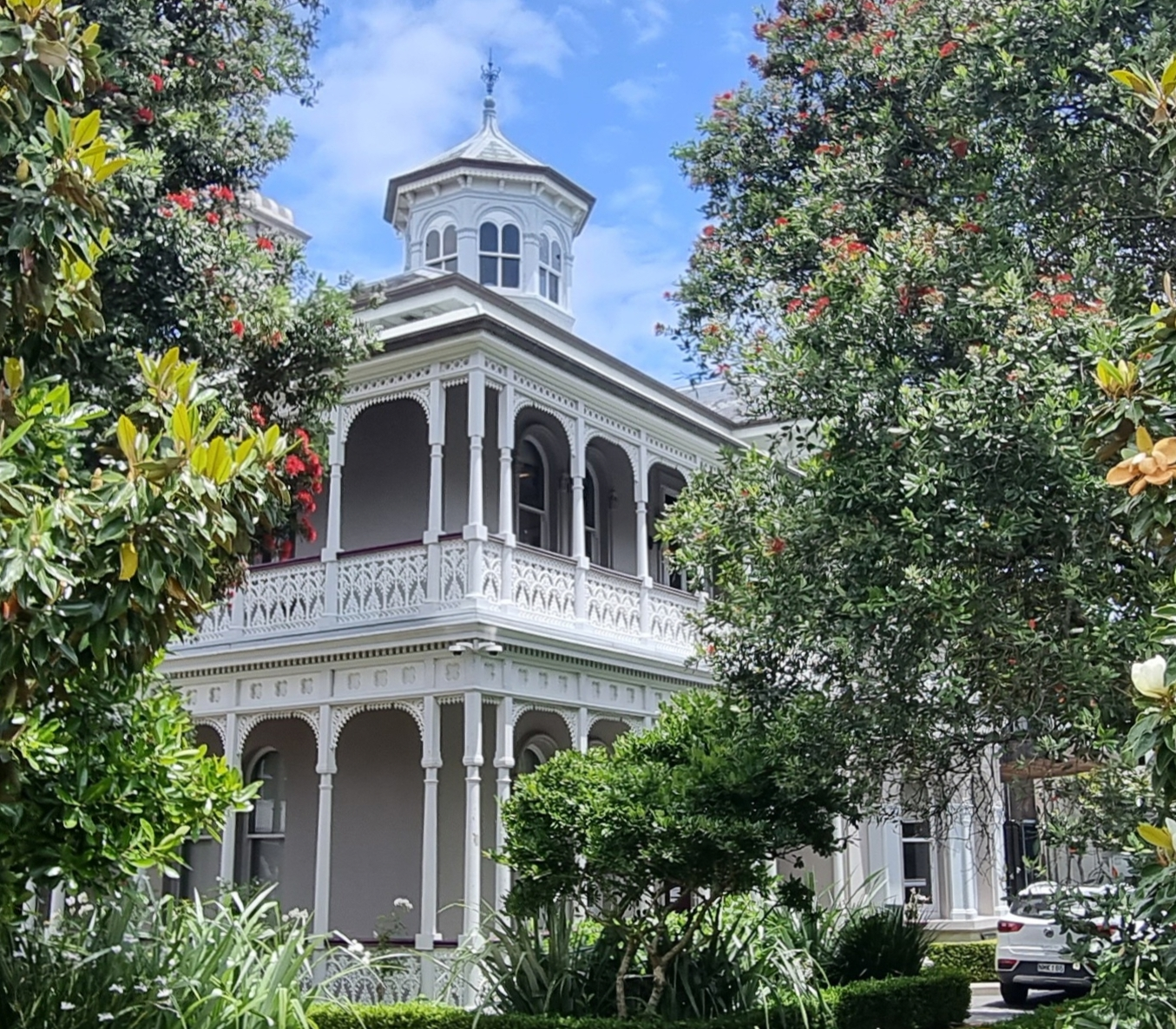
Allendale House

Gloucester Court is an art deco apartment building constructed in 1935. It was one of the first apartment buildings in Freemans Bay.

Allendale was constructed in the 1890s for George Allen. It has served many different purposes over the years including a Maori girls hostel, a boarding home, doctors surgery, and a restaurant.

Te Kāinga Aroha (Former), on Hepburn Street, is a category 1 historic place that was built in 1898. It was home to Andrew Entrican, a manse for St James' Presbyterian Church on Wellington Street, and as a hostel for young Māori women for seventy years.

The Auckland Savings Bank Newton branch was designed by Edward Bartley and constructed in 1884. In 1886 it had another storey added.

== Demographics ==
Freemans Bay covers 1.02 km^{2} (0.39 sq mi) and had an estimated population of 4,080 as of June 2025, with a population density of 4,000 people per km^{2}.

Historical population
Year	Pop.	±% p.a.
2006	3,831	—
2013	4,206	+1.34%
2018	4,407	+0.94%
2023	3,981	−2.01%

Freemans Bay had a population of 3,981 in the 2023 New Zealand census, a decrease of 426 people (−9.7%) since the 2018 census, and a decrease of 225 people (−5.3%) since the 2013 census. There were 1,983 males, 1,974 females and 27 people of other genders in 1,884 dwellings. 11.0% of people identified as LGBTIQ+. The median age was 39.7 years (compared with 38.1 years nationally). There were 342 people (8.6%) aged under 15 years, 882 (22.2%) aged 15 to 29, 2,127 (53.4%) aged 30 to 64, and 627 (15.7%) aged 65 or older.

People could identify as more than one ethnicity. The results were 79.6% European (Pākehā); 9.3% Māori; 5.7% Pasifika; 12.1% Asian; 4.1% Middle Eastern, Latin American and African New Zealanders (MELAA); and 1.9% other, which includes people giving their ethnicity as "New Zealander". English was spoken by 97.7%, Māori language by 2.4%, Samoan by 0.6%, and other languages by 19.5%. No language could be spoken by 1.0% (e.g. too young to talk). New Zealand Sign Language was known by 0.3%. The percentage of people born overseas was 33.8, compared with 28.8% nationally.

Religious affiliations were 23.0% Christian, 1.2% Hindu, 1.4% Islam, 0.5% Māori religious beliefs, 1.1% Buddhist, 0.5% New Age, 0.8% Jewish, and 1.7% other religions. People who answered that they had no religion were 64.3%, and 5.7% of people did not answer the census question.

Of those at least 15 years old, 1,956 (53.8%) people had a bachelor's or higher degree, 1,176 (32.3%) had a post-high school certificate or diploma, and 501 (13.8%) people exclusively held high school qualifications. The median income was $65,300, compared with $41,500 nationally. 1,113 people (30.6%) earned over $100,000 compared to 12.1% nationally. The employment status of those at least 15 was that 2,196 (60.3%) people were employed full-time, 426 (11.7%) were part-time, and 117 (3.2%) were unemployed.

Individual statistical areas
Name	Area (km^{2})	Population	Density (per km^{2})	Dwellings	Median age	Median income
Freemans Bay	0.92	3,441	3,740	1,605	41.0 years	$62,900
College Hill	0.10	540	5,400	279	35.2 years	$80,500
New Zealand					38.1 years	$41,500

== Education ==
Freemans Bay School is a coeducational contributing primary (years 1–6) school with a roll of 607 as of July 2026.

Close by local State secondary schools are Auckland Girls' Grammar School and the Catholic St Paul's College for boys and St Mary's College for girls.
