= Victoria Park Market =

Retail complex in Auckland, New Zealand

Coordinates: 36.8485°S 174.754°E

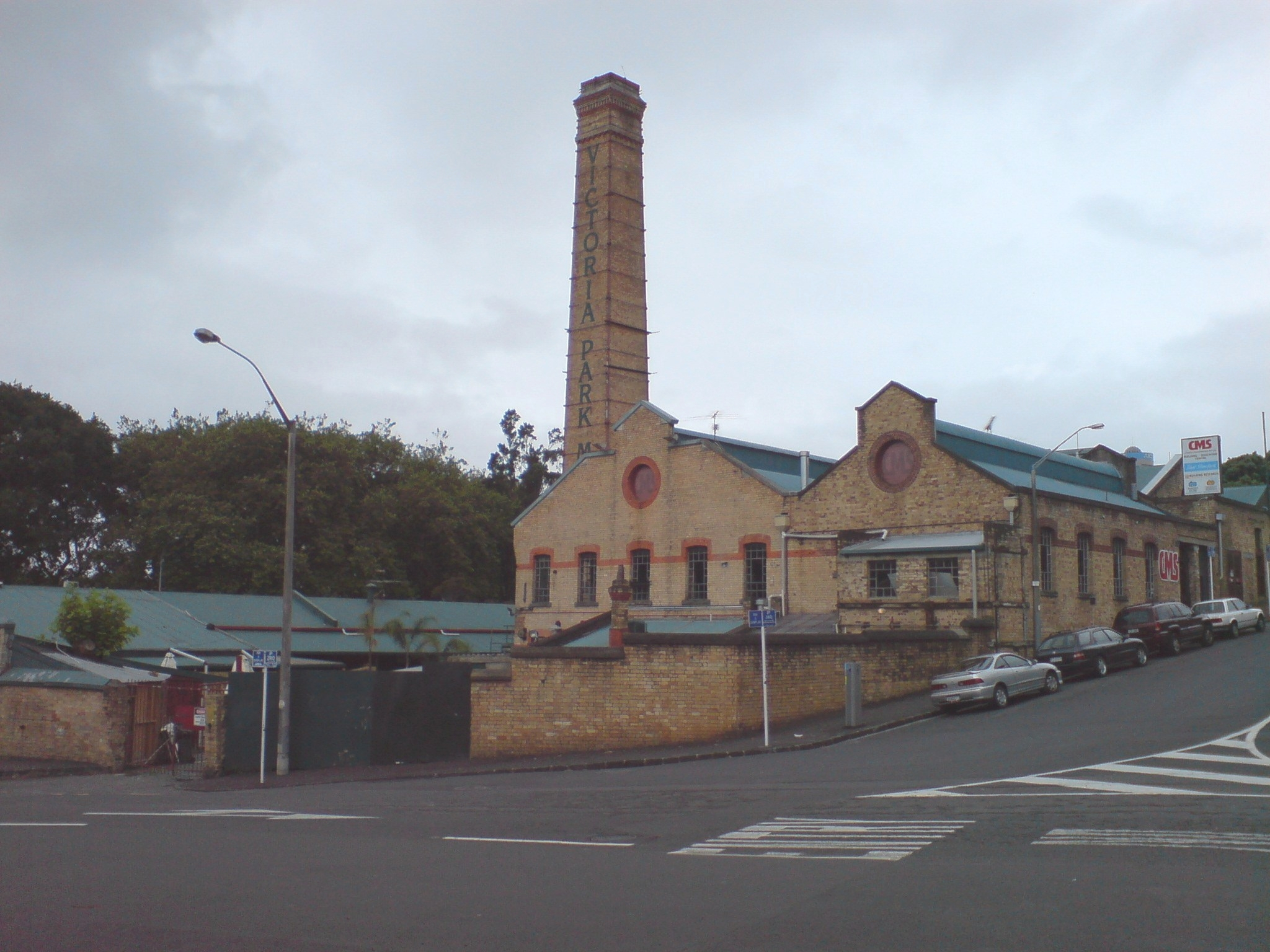
- Former names: Auckland Municipal Destructor and Depot

General information
- Type: Retail complex, formerly a market and prior to this a waste depot and incinerator
- Location: 210 Victoria Street West, Auckland, New Zealand
- Construction started: 1905
- Completed: 1918; 108 years ago

Dimensions
- Other dimensions: 38 metres (chimney)

Design and construction
- Architects: J. Barree Johnson & Co.
- Civil engineer: Alfred Wrigg, W.G.T. Goodman, Turnbull & Jones Ltd., Walter E. Bush and Harry Wrigg
- Other designers: Meldrum Bros. Ltd

Heritage New Zealand – Category 1
- Official name: Auckland Municipal Destructor and Depot (Former)
- Designated: 30-Jun-2006
- Reference no.: 7664

Victoria Park Market is a cluster of galleries, workshops, studios, offices, restaurants and retail shops as well as a gym and Pilates Studio in Auckland, New Zealand. The precinct is housed in a former waste depot and incinerator complex. It is located in Freemans Bay and its name derives from the adjacent Victoria Park which was created in 1905 and named after the late Queen who had died four years earlier.

Until April 2016 the precinct was a craft, souvenir and clothing market and retail complex. It underwent a $22M refurbishment allowing for the earthquake proofing of the historic buildings and the introduction of some new buildings.

The weekend Pop Up Markets recommenced in June 2017 after the refurbishment works were completed. There is a popular Celebrity Walk of Fame; this opened in 1984, and features the hand or footprints of famous New Zealanders including Sir Edmund Hillary, Dame Kiri Te Kanawa, Billy T James, John Walker and Rachel Hunter.

== Site history ==
The site of the Victoria Park Market buildings was originally part headland and part foreshore of Freemans Bay. In the late 1870s the bay began to be reclaimed, and various commercial and residential buildings were erected on the widened foreshore. The street directly behind and above the market runs along the top of the ancient sea cliff.

Fear of bubonic plague from rats Auckland residents disposing of rubbish in vacant lots led the Auckland City Council to consider a purpose-built incinerator in 1900. Construction of the Meldrum Destructor was tendered in 1904 to J. Barre Johnston Ltd of Sydney, and completed in 1905. From 1905 to 1918 a series of brickwork buildings was constructed on the site, including a works debut, blacksmith, carpenters, stables and a 38m tall chimney. On 10 February 1908, a power generator was opened at the site, using the heat produced by the destructor and coal. The amount of power generated did not meet demand, so three 225 kW steam generators were installed soon afterwards. Demand for power kept increasing, and the plant was shut down in 1913 after a new coal fired power station was constructed on the city's waterfront at Kings Wharf.

Further additions were made from 1914 to 1918, including double storeyed stabling for the 94 horses used to pull the city's rubbish carts, and council administration offices. From 1952 the stables were no longer used for their original purpose, and the 'Destructor' ceased operation in 1972, although the complex continued to act as a rubbish collection depot until 1981.

The Auckland City Council originally planned to demolish the complex, but relented following a public campaign. It was converted into a market and retail complex, and alterations were made for this purpose in 1983 and 1990. The complex is a Category I Historic Places under the Historic Places Act 1993.

A further redevelopment was delayed by the 2008 financial crisis but a NZ$20 million refurbishment began in 2012 and was complete by mid-2013.

The refurbished market was branded as an urban village, an upmarket retail precinct in a heritage setting, with offerings including lifestyle and beauty stores, cafes, delicatessens, restaurants and bars.
