= Jacobs Ladder Bridge =

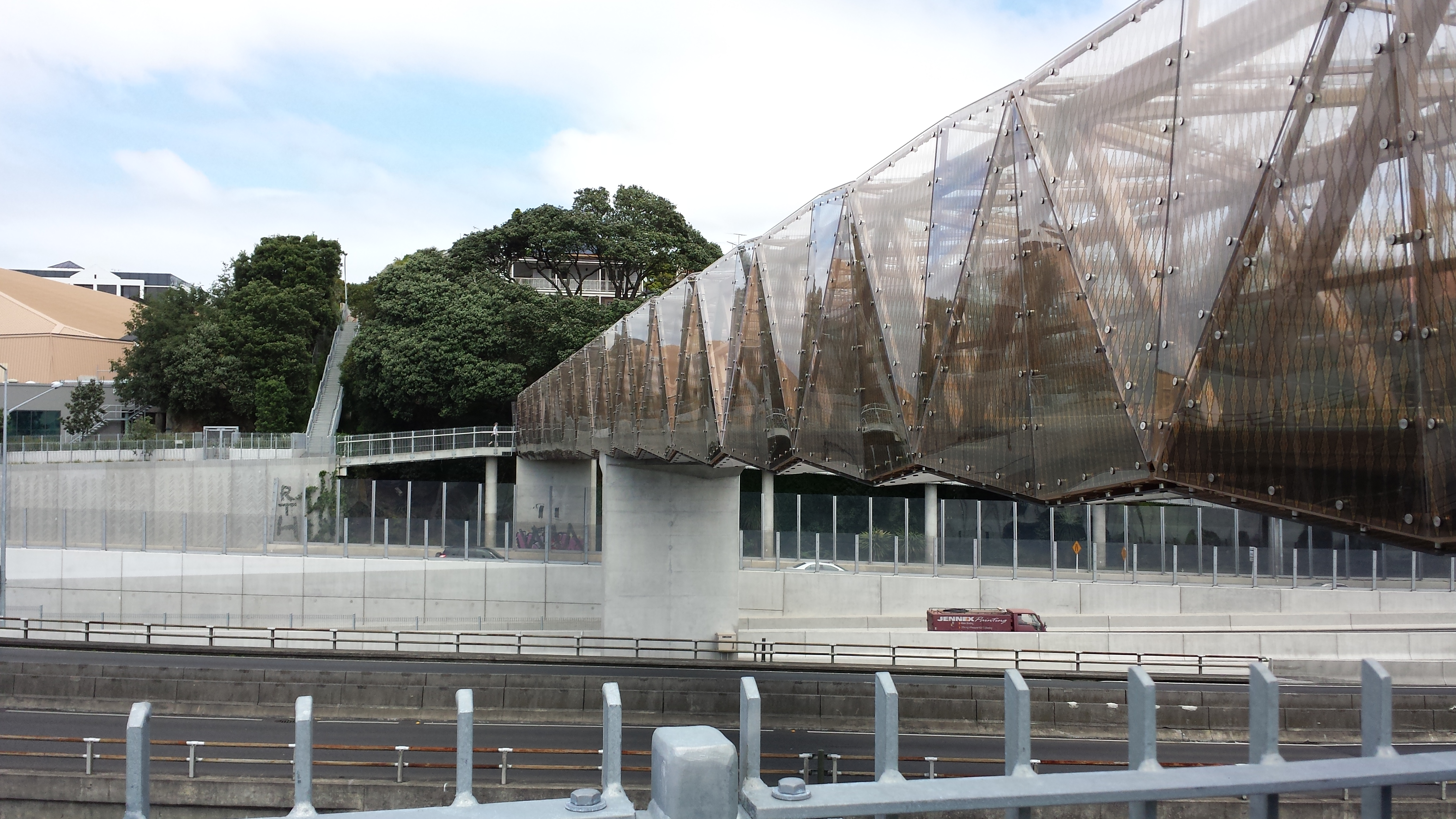
- Coordinates: 36.843986°S 174.75079°E
- Carries: Pedestrians
- Crosses: Auckland Northern Motorway
- Locale: Saint Marys Bay, Auckland, New Zealand

Characteristics
- Design: Truss bridge
- No. of spans: 2

History
- Opened: 15 December 2012; 12 years ago

The Jacobs Ladder Bridge is a covered footbridge over State Highway 1 in Auckland, New Zealand. It was officially opened on 15 December 2012.

The bridge connects Westhaven Marina, over the widened 10-lane motorway, to the Jacob's Ladder stairs leading up to the Saint Marys Bay suburb. The bridge is 102m long, 3.7m wide, and be 6m above the motorway with an internal height of 3m. The bridge was forecast to cost up to $5 million. The final cost of the bridge was $7.9 million.

The bridge provides a gateway statement to Auckland for travellers on the motorway, clad in a golden-coloured mesh network reminiscent of Maori fishing nets or fish traps, and it is lit up at night to provide a similar visual effect.

Previously, the Jacob's Ladder stairs had come all the way down to the motorway level on the southern side, and then connected on the eastern side via a footpath. The stairs now only extend down as far as the bridge's crossing height, with ramped pedestrian paths running west and east along the motorway's southern side. On the northern side, stairs and an elevator provide access down to the marina car park.

Construction was underway for abutments and column footings of the bridge as of early 2011. While Jacob's Ladder access was restored in time for the Rugby World Cup 2011, the new bridge was to be completed some time later. In August 2011, the two trusses had been installed, and the floor slabs for the bridge were beginning to be installed, transport in place by a temporary "monorail" attached to the top of the truss.

== History of the name ==
The Bridge derives its name from the adjacent staircase, originally a wooden set of stairs dating from the late 19th or early 20th century and now replaced by a newer structure built at the same time as the bridge. The Auckland stairs derive their name, as do other similar stairs around the world, from a Biblical reference.

Jacob's Ladder is the colloquial name for a bridge between the Earth and heaven that the biblical Patriarch Jacob dreams about during his flight from his brother Esau, as described in the Book of Genesis. "And he dreamed, and behold, there was a ladder set up on the earth, and the top of it reached to heaven; and behold, the angels of God were ascending and descending on it!".

This name is applied to a number of steep public staircases throughout the world as well as being depicted on a large scale as sculptural elements on the facade of Bath Abbey. The name also has many other uses.
