= Jacobs Ladder (exercise machine) =

Angled climbing ladder used for exercise

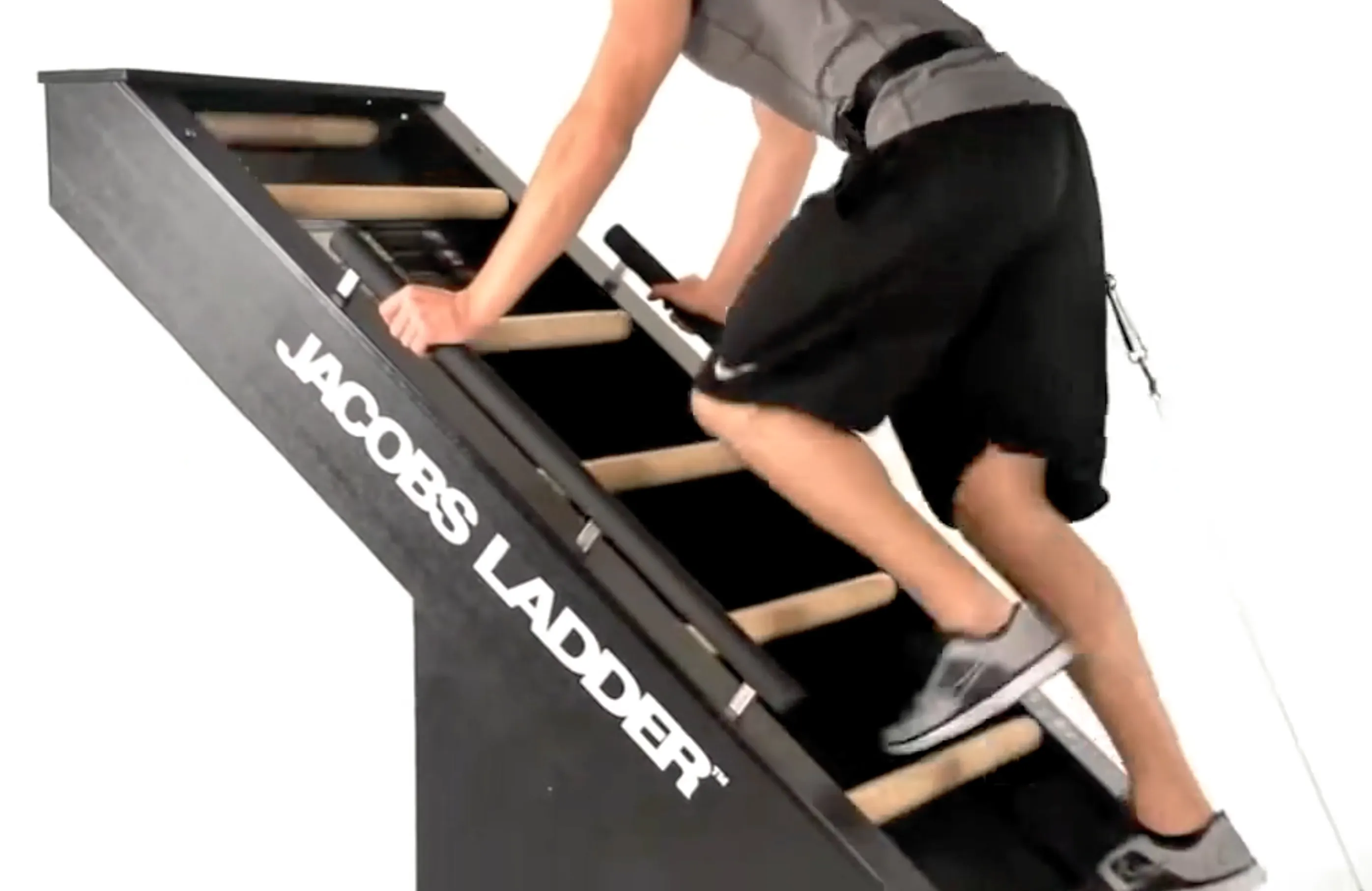
Jacobs Ladder

The Jacobs Ladder is an exercise machine consisting of a runged ladder angled at 40 degrees. It is non-motorized, and thus self-paced. It is named after the Biblical Jacob's Ladder, a ladder to heaven which appeared in the dream of the patriarch Jacob.

== History ==
The machine was invented and patented by Steve Nichols in 1994. Nichols had injured his knees and back and wanted to do a full-body workout that didn't put excessive stress on those injured body parts.

== Usage ==
5–10 minutes is considered a beginner duration, 10–20 for moderate, and 20–30 for an advanced level. The Jacobs Ladder works out both the lower and upper body, and it is a favorite among groups such as United States Army Rangers, United States Navy SEALs, and The Biggest Loser contestants. The main muscles activated in the exercise are the quads, glutes, shoulders, and lats. Research from Louisiana State University has concluded that compared to a treadmill, the Jacobs Ladder allows a person to work out harder while expending less effort. Due to the pressure applied on the inner abdominal muscles, the exercise is generally considered unsafe for pregnant women, especially after the 16th week of pregnancy.
