= Western Park, Auckland =

Public park in New Zealand

Coordinates: 36.856291°S 174.75214°E

Western Park
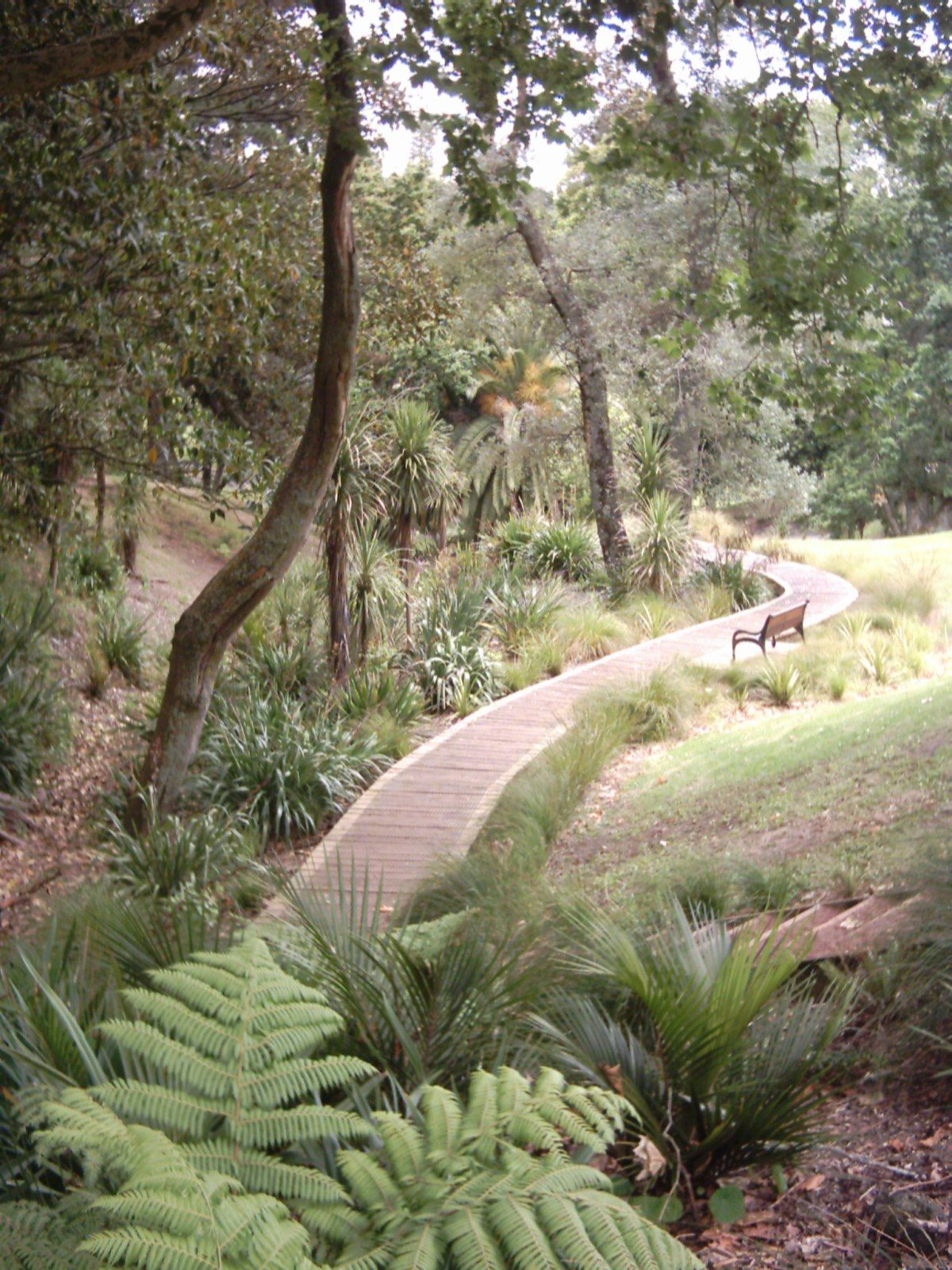
- A boardwalk passes through the upper part of the park.
- Interactive map of Western Park
- Type: Public park
- Location: Auckland, New Zealand
- Created: 1879
- Operator: Auckland Council
- Status: Open year round, 24 hours

Western Park is a midsized public park located in the suburb of Freemans Bay, west of the CBD of Auckland, New Zealand. It is situated in two merging gullies which run downhill to the sea (now several kilometres away due to land reclamation) from what was once called Te Rimu Tahi ridge (the 'lone Rimu tree ridge' in Maori). Originally, the Tuna Mau stream used to run through the park's area. The location makes the southern parts of the park rather steep, so that it is accessed by boardwalk stairs descending from Hopetoun Street or steep paths from Ponsonby Road, while the main entry is from Beresford Street West or lower Howe Street.

The park has several walkways, public toilets, a children's playground and a small performance space blended into the scenery.

== History ==
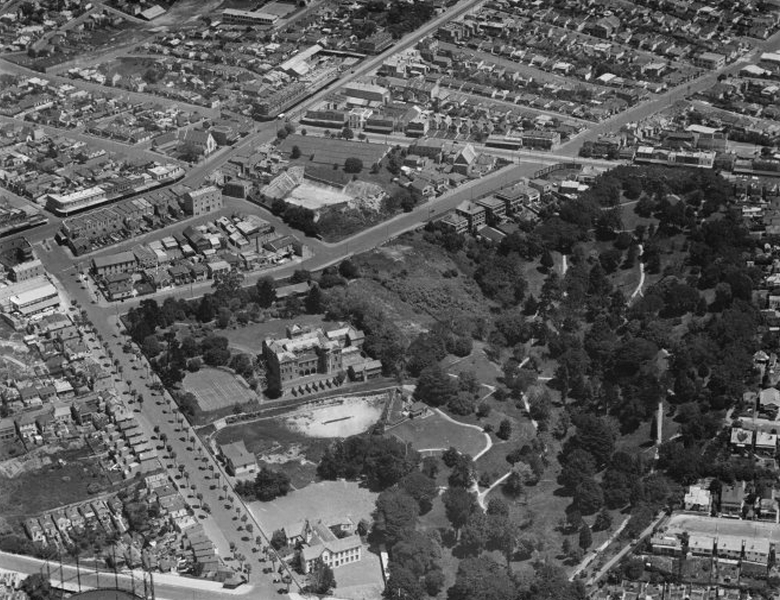
The park from the air in 1934

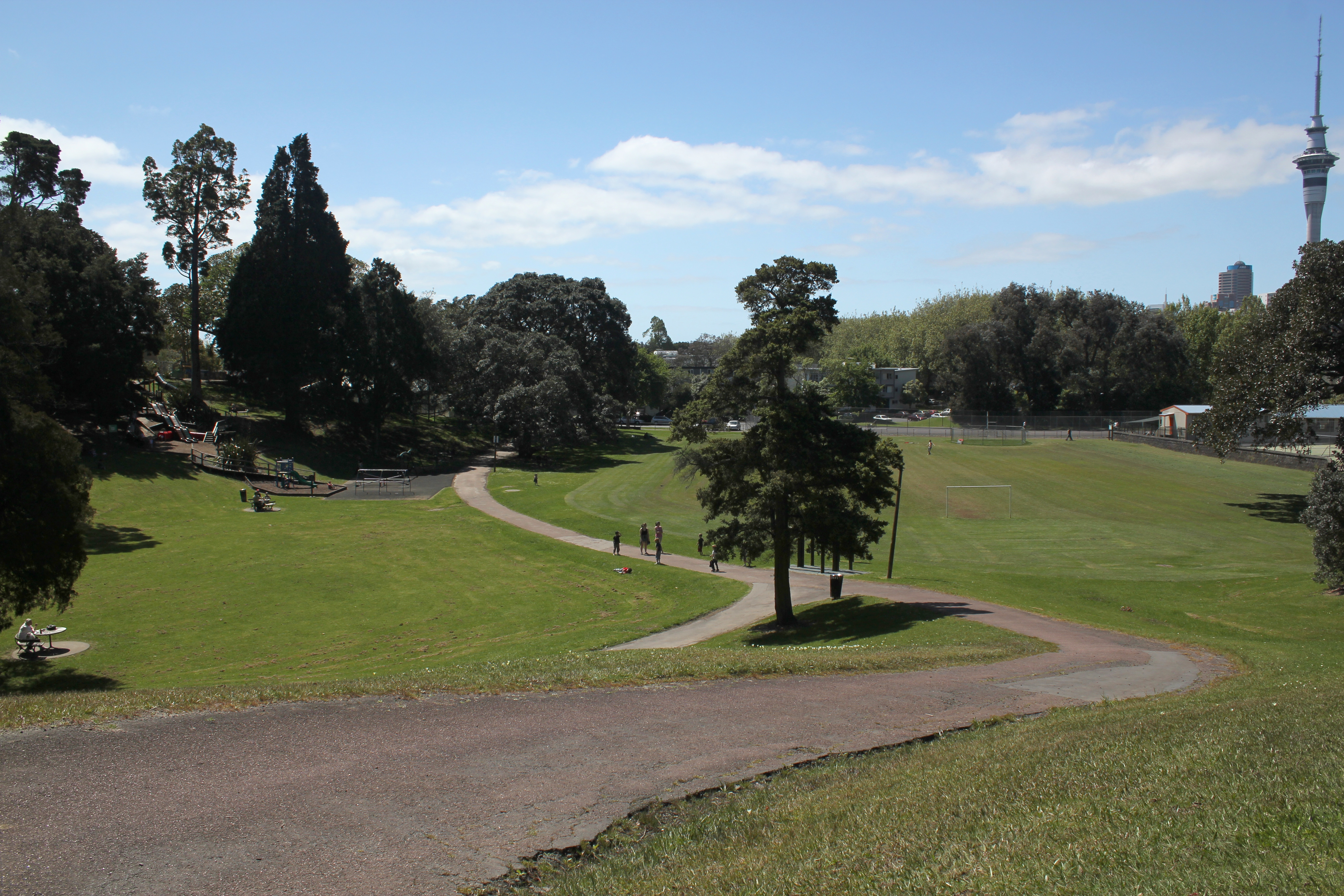
The lower part of Western Park

The park dates back to the late-19th century, and is considered one of the city's most distinguished open spaces. It may be considered Auckland's oldest Municipal park as the Auckland Domain was created by Central Government. The original parcel of land set aside in 1871 consisted of a coffin-shaped wedge going from Ponsonby Road down to Beresford Street, with access to the park being gained from a very narrow frontage on Ponsonby Road. This was land on each side of the stream, which in pre-European times had been called Tuna-Mau by the local Māori, meaning 'the trapping of eels'. The stream was one of several which emptied into Freeman Bay, now reclaimed as Victoria Park.

In 1873, the city council decided to call for a new park design, and declared that the sum of ten guineas/pounds (then quite a sum) would be awarded as prize money to the creator of the winning design. Out of 11 different concepts that were submitted, the 'Lily of the Valley' design of Hammond and Blackmore was chosen for the new "City Park". Western Park, as it was eventually called, was soon finished, at a cost of £200 and in 1874 the City Parks Committee did note that "upwards of 1100 deciduous and coniferous trees of the choicest kind [were] to be planted in the park."

The grounds were laid out in accordance with the lay of the land; with paths winding down the hill from Ponsonby Road to a small flat area at the bottom of the site. The top of the park enjoyed views of the Waitematā Harbour and the city while the lower area could be used for activities. The park's expansive planting scheme of trees made it an arboretum, a popular and fairly new concept at the time. Many of the specimen trees were gifts of prominent citizens, in particular Sir George Grey and Sir Maurice O'Rorke (Speaker of the House). The park was vested with the city council in 1875 and in 1879 the Auckland Star reported the city following the example of 'the civilised world' with the official opening on November 17.

The eastern edge is almost largely bounded by the grounds of Auckland Girls' Grammar School which has occupied that site since 1909 taking the place of earlier educational and government facilities. Visually the two areas of greenery merge into one another. On the western edge of the park are private residences, mostly late 19th century. Their presence goes unnoted for the most part as they are largely obscured by mature trees.

The park was enlarged in the 1970s when the two adjacent portions of land on the Ponsonby Road frontage were incorporated into the park. This required the demolition of a block of shops on the corner of Hepburn Street called the "Western Stores" and at least one wooden house on the corner of Hopetoun Street. At the bottom of the park the flat playing field has been augmented by the addition of asphalt tennis courts, formed out of a portion of a decommissioned public road. Another portion of land on Hopetoun Street was added in the 1980s and was re-landscaped in the early 2000s creating a viewing platform from where a view of the harbour can be enjoyed.

The large specimen trees planted in the 19th century have largely obscured the view of the harbour once obtainable from Ponsonby Road. Around 1910 a Band Rotunda was built as a centre piece for the park - no longer in existence (probably demolished in the mid 20th century) it stood near the centre entrance on Ponsonby Road.

Recently various works have been undertaken, including tree planting, and general improvement works largely followed the original design. The pre World War One brick toilet block has been retained since being decommissioned - it is now supplanted by a modern stainless steel unit. Most significant of the new works are the sculptural artworks by sculptor John Radford which are a feature of the flat area directly adjacent to the Ponsonby Road. The three sculpture works by Radford represent pieces of buildings that once stood in Auckland, artistically sunk into the ground in the manner of ancient ruins. Park furniture by local artist and silversmith Matthew von Sturmer is also a feature of the park.

== Biodiversity ==
The original plantings in the park consisted of mostly exotic species, including Agathis robusta, stone pine, Pinus canariensis, Araucaria columnaris, Cinnamomum camphora, Cupressus cashmeriana, Syzygium smithii, Quercus robur and Pinus radiata.
