= Saint Marys Bay, New Zealand =

Saint Marys Bay
- Suburb
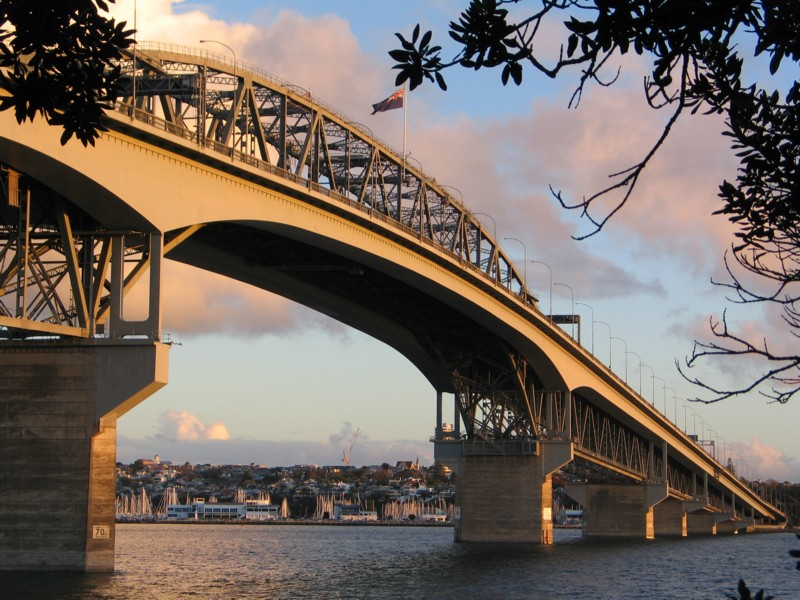
- The suburb and Westhaven Marina seen under the Auckland Harbour Bridge from the North Shore.
- Interactive map of Saint Marys Bay
- Coordinates: 36°50′42″S 174°44′47″E
- Country: New Zealand
- City: Auckland
- Local authority: Auckland Council
- Electoral ward: Waitematā and Gulf ward
- Local board: Waitematā Local Board

Area
  - Land: 83 ha (210 acres)

Population (June 2025)
  - Total: 2,040
  - Density: 2,500/km^{2} (6,400/sq mi)

| (Waitematā Harbour) | (Waitematā Harbour), Birkenhead | (Westhaven Marina), Wynyard Quarter |
| Herne Bay | Saint Marys Bay | Freemans Bay |
| Ponsonby | Ponsonby | Freemans Bay |

Saint Marys Bay is an inner suburb of Auckland, New Zealand.

== Demographics ==
Saint Marys Bay covers 0.83 km^{2} (0.32 sq mi) and had an estimated population of 2,040 as of June 2025, with a population density of 2,458 people per km^{2}.

Historical population
| Year | Pop. | ±% p.a. |
|---|---|---|
| 2006 | 2,169 | — |
| 2013 | 2,286 | +0.75% |
| 2018 | 2,205 | −0.72% |
| 2023 | 2,049 | −1.46% |

Saint Marys Bay had a population of 2,049 in the 2023 New Zealand census, a decrease of 156 people (−7.1%) since the 2018 census, and a decrease of 237 people (−10.4%) since the 2013 census. There were 987 males, 1,059 females and 6 people of other genders in 915 dwellings. 7.2% of people identified as LGBTIQ+. The median age was 48.7 years (compared with 38.1 years nationally). There were 189 people (9.2%) aged under 15 years, 378 (18.4%) aged 15 to 29, 984 (48.0%) aged 30 to 64, and 495 (24.2%) aged 65 or older.

People could identify as more than one ethnicity. The results were 86.5% European (Pākehā); 7.3% Māori; 2.8% Pasifika; 10.4% Asian; 2.5% Middle Eastern, Latin American and African New Zealanders (MELAA); and 1.3% other, which includes people giving their ethnicity as "New Zealander". English was spoken by 98.1%, Māori language by 1.6%, Samoan by 0.3%, and other languages by 17.4%. No language could be spoken by 0.7% (e.g. too young to talk). New Zealand Sign Language was known by 0.4%. The percentage of people born overseas was 31.2, compared with 28.8% nationally.

Religious affiliations were 31.3% Christian, 1.2% Hindu, 0.4% Islam, 0.7% Buddhist, 0.4% New Age, 0.7% Jewish, and 1.0% other religions. People who answered that they had no religion were 58.1%, and 6.1% of people did not answer the census question.

Of those at least 15 years old, 969 (52.1%) people had a bachelor's or higher degree, 651 (35.0%) had a post-high school certificate or diploma, and 237 (12.7%) people exclusively held high school qualifications. The median income was $63,800, compared with $41,500 nationally. 594 people (31.9%) earned over $100,000 compared to 12.1% nationally. The employment status of those at least 15 was that 990 (53.2%) people were employed full-time, 252 (13.5%) were part-time, and 39 (2.1%) were unemployed.

== Historical timeline ==
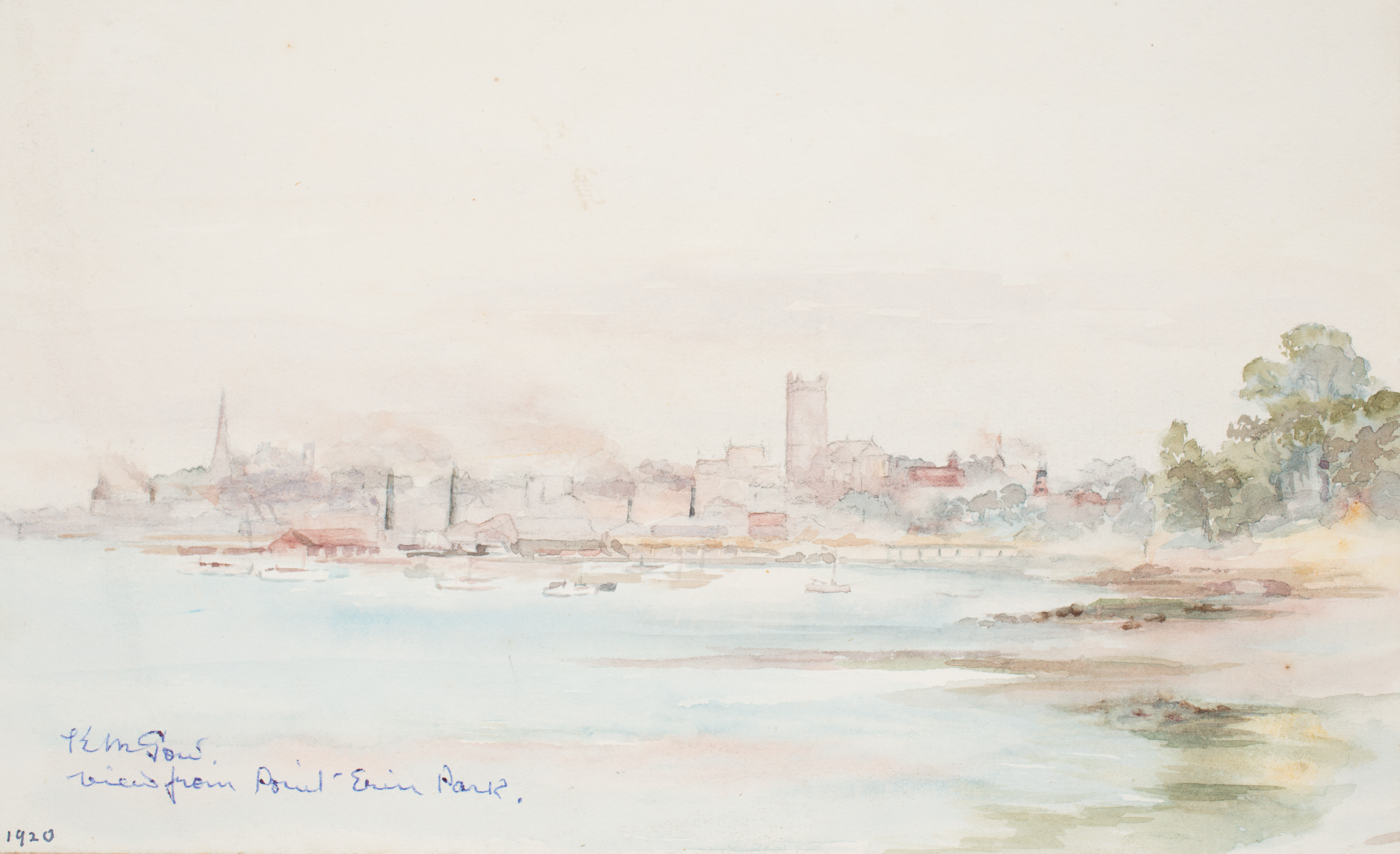
View from Point Erin Park, a 1920 watercolour of Saint Marys Bay by Kate Gow looking east towards the Auckland CBD

=== 1700s ===
Point Erin, to the western side of the bay (underneath the Auckland Harbour Bridge) was the location of a Māori pā called Okā, or Te Koraenga ("the headland"). Tāmaki Māori traditionally used the pā as a fishing base during the summer shark fishing season. Saint Marys Bay was known as Ko Takere Haere ("the split canoe hull"), recalling an incident where a waka that was being taken ashore by slaves broke.

=== 1800s ===
mid-1840s George Scott farms the land where Three Lamps is now.

1853 For £1100 Catholic Bishop Pompallier purchases 19 hectares (47 acres) in the area between Three Lamps and the shoreline from James O’Neill, christening it Mount Saint Mary.

1854 O’Neill's house becomes St. Anne's School for Maori Girls run by the Sisters of Mercy. Responding to a Maori request for holy women to teach the children, the sisters of Mercy arrived in Auckland from Ireland in 1850 already fluent in the Maori language. Their first school and orphanage were situated near St Patrick's Cathedral in Federal Street in the CBD.

1854 St Mary's College for Catechists on the North Shore is transferred to Ponsonby. St. Marys School for Boys and a Seminary are built on 5 acres (20,000 m^{2}) of Crown Grant land at the end of Waitemata Street.

1858 The wooden Church of the Immaculate Conception is built. [Demolished 1869–70, present site of the Ponsonby Tennis Club].

1859 New Street is put through the middle of the St Mary Mount estate and Bishop Pompallier presents land on the eastern side of the street for the creation of St. Mary's College. Almost unaided the sisters erect a three-storey convent building and open it in 1861. The only surviving building from this period is the Kauri St Mary's Chapel constructed in 1865 by Edward Mahoney for £1100.

1860s Many Roman Catholics buy land in the new subdivisions in order to be near the Catholic centre with its church, convent and schools. Names such as "Dublin" and "Green" reflect this development.

1860 Bishop Pompallier returns from Europe with a group of French nuns. They form under his direction, the Congregation of the Holy Family, which concentrates on teaching Maori girls.

1861 St. Anne's boarding school occupies O'Neill's former house.

1862 The Convent is completed. The new order of the Holy Family takes over teaching at the school. The order now consists of Maori and French Sisters.

1862 The Bishop takes over O'Neill's former house as his official residence.

1863 The Bishop sells more land, retaining the 4 acres (16,000 m^{2}) with the Bishop's House, The Church of the Holy Family and the Convent of the Holy Family. The Nazareth Institute for Maori and Half-Caste Girls is founded.

1866 St. Mary's Convent, with its dormitories and chapel is built.

1865–68 The Suffolk Hotel [now the Cavalier Tavern] is built on College Hill.

1869–70 The Convent of the Holy Family is destroyed by fire. The Catholic Bishop is forced by his mortgagee to sell his remaining land, including the Bishop's House. The buyer is a Mr. Bennett who demolishes the Church of the Immaculate Conception [now the Ponsonby Tennis Club]. The Bishop resigns and leaves, leading to the dissolution of the order he had formed, the Order of the Holy Family. Saint Mary's Convent remains.

1873 Bishop Croke, the second Catholic Bishop of Auckland buys back the land with the Bishop's House on it. In 1874 the wooden house is moved to its present location at 57 St Marys Road.

1874 The farm "Campbellville" owned by John Campbell is subdivided for suburban development.

1886–87 The Catholic Church of the Sacred Heart is built on the corner of O’Neill St and Ponsonby Road. This takes over the role of Parish Church from St Mary's Chapel.

1890s The underground men's public toilets at Three Lamps are built – these are possibly the first such public utilities in Auckland.

1894 The New Bishop's Palace is constructed to the designs of Pugin & Pugin, Edward. W. Pugin (1834–1875) and Peter Paul Pugin (1851–1904), sons of Augustus Pugin, the Gothic Revivalist architect responsible for much of the decorative work of the Palace of Westminster. The Bishop's Palace was partly funded by donations from all over the world including 5,000 schools in Europe and the US, the Lord Mayor of London and an Archduchess of Austria. This imposing brick gothic structure is believed to be the first house in Auckland to have been constructed with electric lighting.

=== 1900s ===
1902 The Ponsonby Fire Station in St Marys Road is built. [Goldsb'ro & Wade Architects].

1905 The Leys Institute at Three Lamps is established by brothers William Leys and Dr Thomas Leys. This splendid Edwardian Baroque building contains a public library, lecture hall and gymnasium.

1911 The Ponsonby Post Office is built. John Campbell – Government Architect [NZ Historic Places Listing].

1912 The Shelly Beach Baths, a popular mixed gender salt water bathing area, was opened.

1950s The foreshore of Saint Marys Bay disappears during the construction of the motorway approaches to the Harbour Bridge. Cut off from the sea a great number of small commercial boatyards are forced to close and many private boat-slips which have been used for almost a century fall into disuse. The Auckland Harbour Board plan to fill in Westhaven completely. A group of local residents including engineers and architects donate their services to create Westhaven Marina, now one of Auckland's greatest assets.

1959 The Auckland Harbour Bridge opens.

== Transport ==
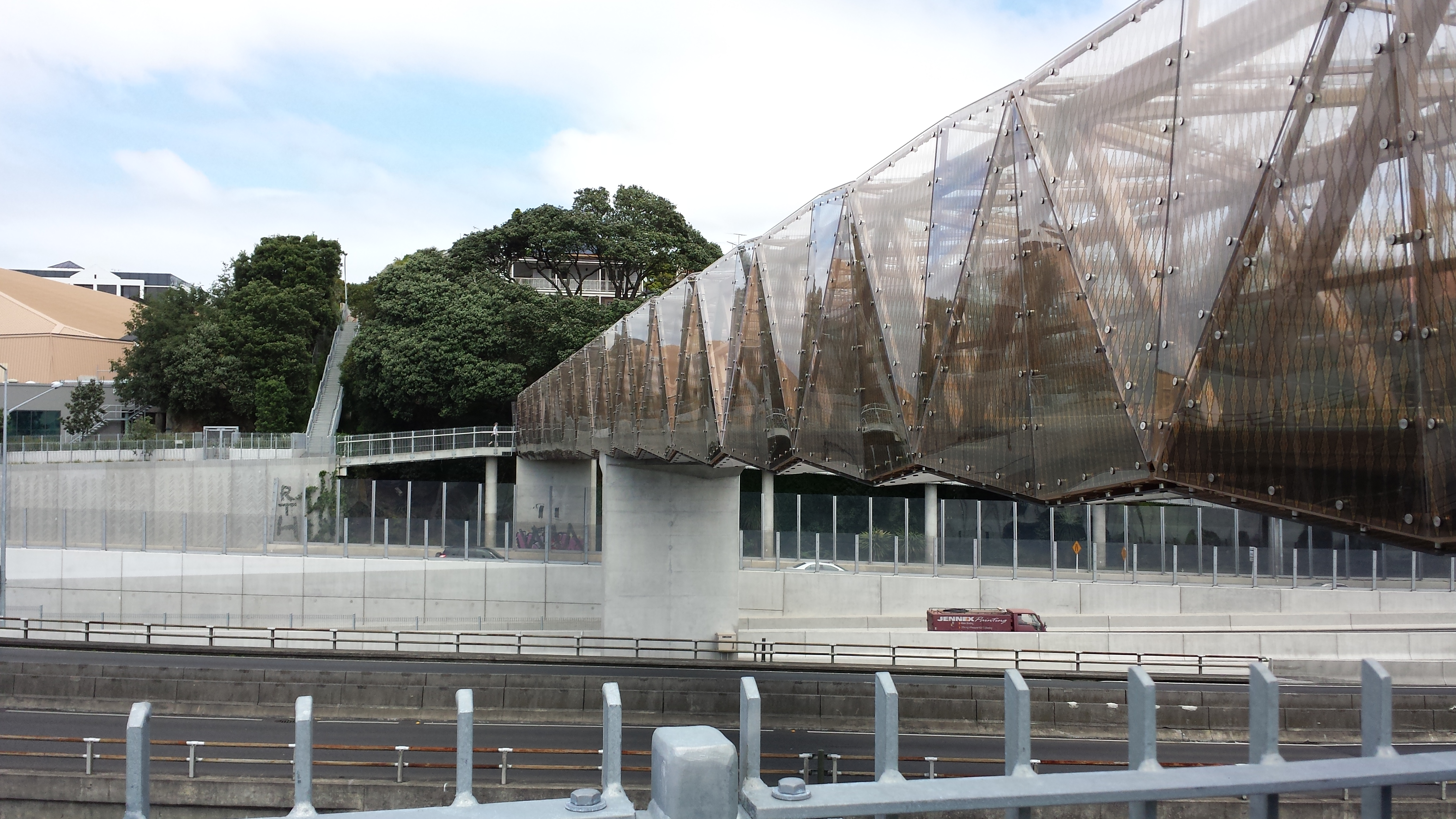
Jacobs Ladder Bridge

The suburb used to have direct links down the cliffs with several paths and roads to the foreshore and later to the Wynyard Quarter to its northeast. However, with the construction of the motorway, these links mostly disappeared. In 2012 the Jacobs Ladder Bridge over State Highway 1 was opened as part of motorway works in the northeast of Saint Marys Bay providing a pedestrian link to Westhaven Marina.

== Education ==
St Mary's College is a state-integrated Catholic girls' secondary school (years 7–13) school with a roll of 1,012 as of March 2026.

Close by local State secondary schools are Auckland Girls' Grammar School and the state-integrated Catholic St Paul's College for boys.

== Famous residents ==
- The Catholic Bishop of Auckland – Every Bishop since Bishop Pompallier has resided in the Palace in St Mary's Bay.
- Sister Mary Leo – singing teacher who taught Dame Kiri te Kanawa and Dame Malvina Major.
- Flora MacKenzie – notorious brothel owner whose establishment was in Ring Terrace.
