= Commercial Bay (disambiguation) =

Commercial Bay was a bay on Waitematā Harbour that defined the original extent of the Auckland waterfront in Auckland, New Zealand.

Commercial Bay may also refer to:

- Commercial Bay (skyscraper), a tower block in Auckland, New Zealand.
- Commercial Bay Shopping Centre, a shopping centre in Auckland, New Zealand
