= Customs Street =

Street in Auckland city centre, New Zealand

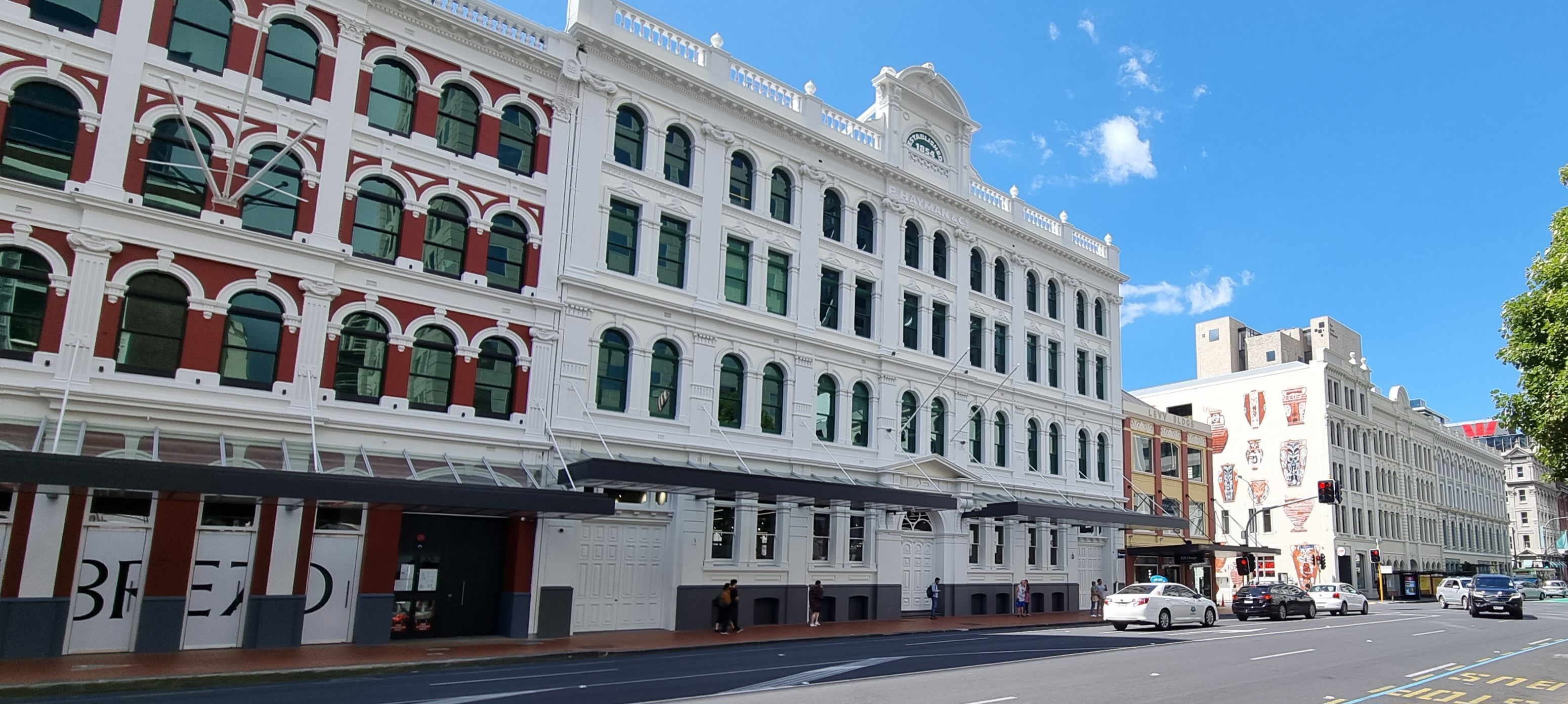
- Customs Street in 2023
- Length: 0.61 km (0.38 mi)
- Location: Auckland City Centre, New Zealand
- Postal code: 1010
- Coordinates: 36.84470°S 174.76660°E
- West end: Hobson Street
- Major junctions: Queen Street
- East end: Beach Road

Customs Street is a street in the Auckland City Centre, New Zealand, located between Hobson Street and Beach Road. The street is split into two sections at the junction of Queen Street, Customs Street West and Customs Street East.

== History ==
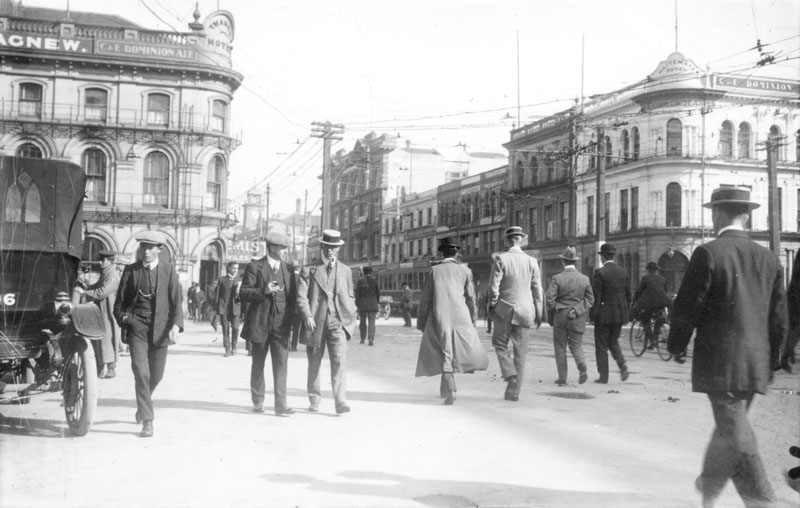
Corner of Queen Street and Customs Street in the early 20th century

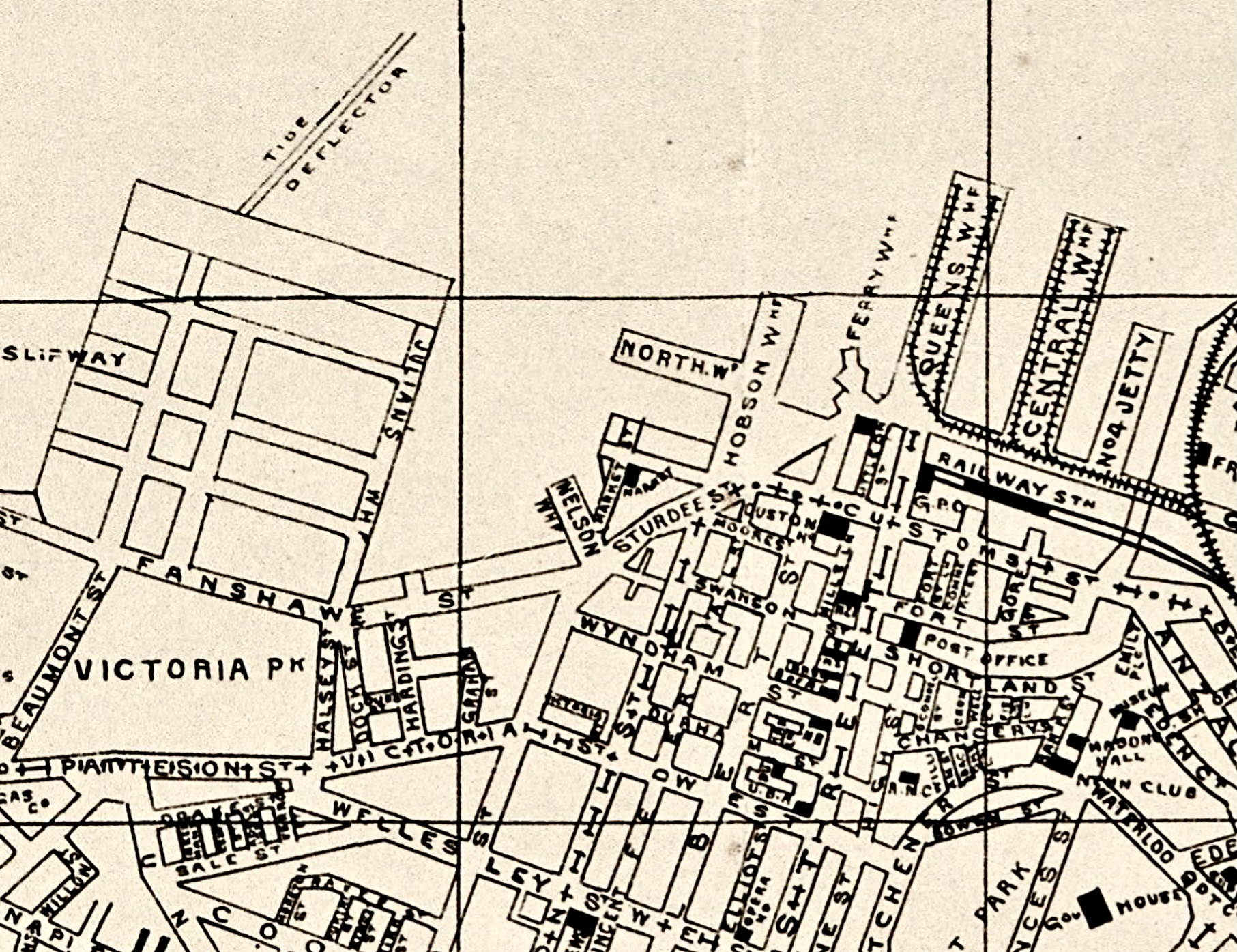
1925 map - the western end of the street was still part of the harbour. The area was filled in between 1940 and 1950 and the road formed by 1958

Customs Street was built on reclaimed land. Customs Street East began as a seawall between Point Stanley and Point Britomart across Commercial Bay, a former bay that used to exist on the Auckland waterfront. By 1859, reclamation work on Commercial Bay had begun, and Customs Street was created. Much of the fill used to create the land along Customs Street was taken from Point Britomart, a former peninsula to the east of the street.

The street was an important centre for trade in Auckland in the early 20th century due to its proximity to the Auckland waterfront and the railway station. Customs Street had a mix of warehouses, commercial offices of shipping companies found on the north, with shops and businesses found to the south.

== Demographics ==
The demographics of the Quay Street-Customs Street statistical area are covered at Quay Street, Auckland#Demographics.

== Notable locations ==
- The Aon Centre, also known as the AMP Tower
- Australis House
- Commercial Bay, a mixed-use development consisting of the PwC Tower and the Commercial Bay Shopping Centre.
- The former Customhouse, now the location of duty-free shopping centre T Galleria
- The Dilworth Building, a historic mixed-use building constructed in the 1920s
- Seascape, a residential skyscraper currently under construction
- Queens Arcade, a historic shopping arcade
- The United States Consulate General

== Gallery ==
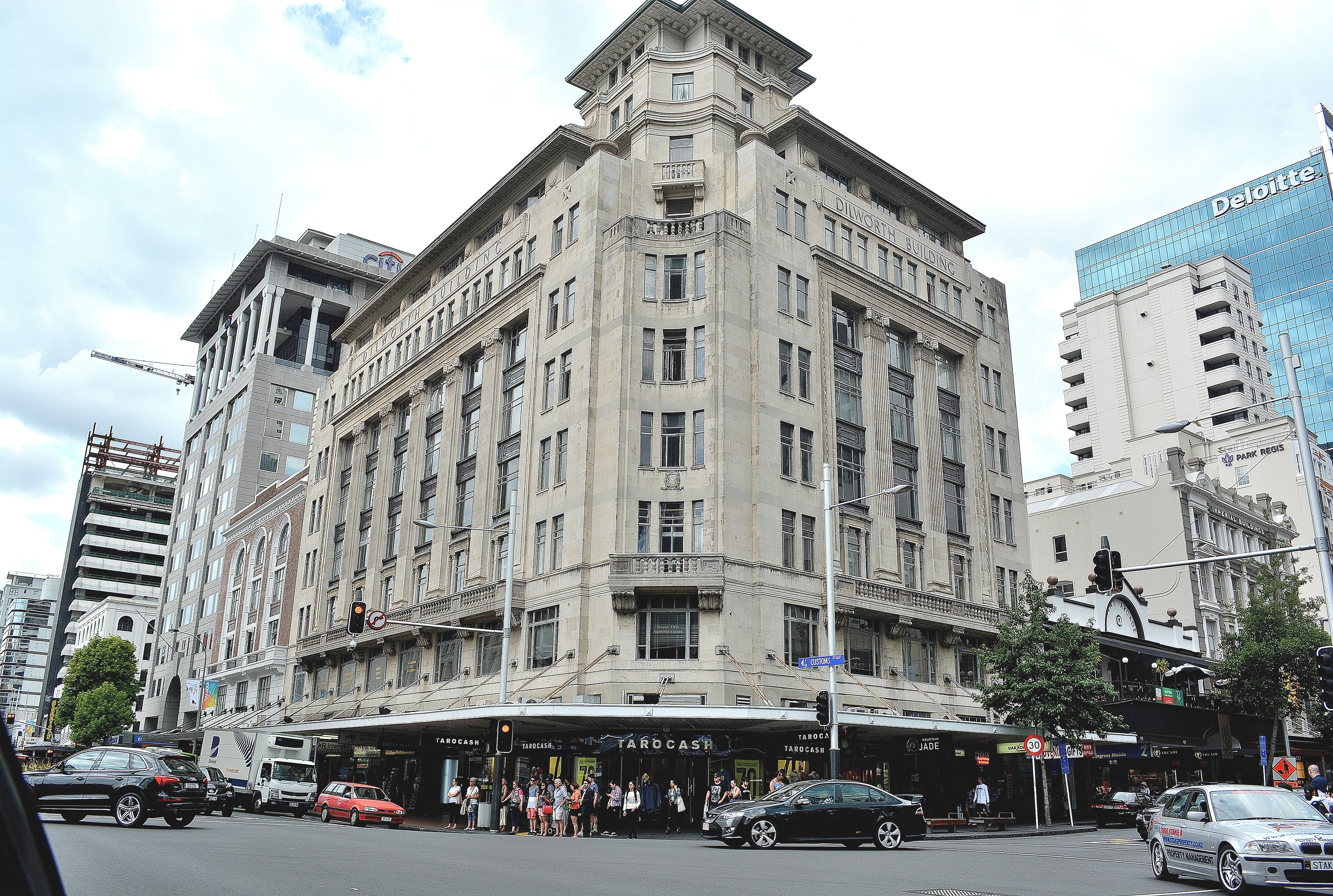
The Dilworth Building

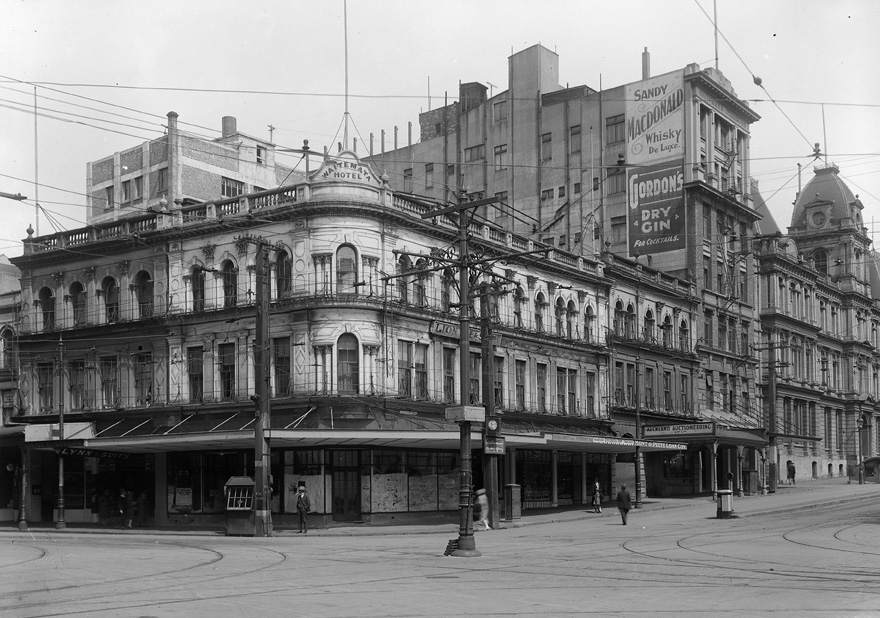
the Waitemata Hotel on the corner of Queen Street and Customs Street in 1927

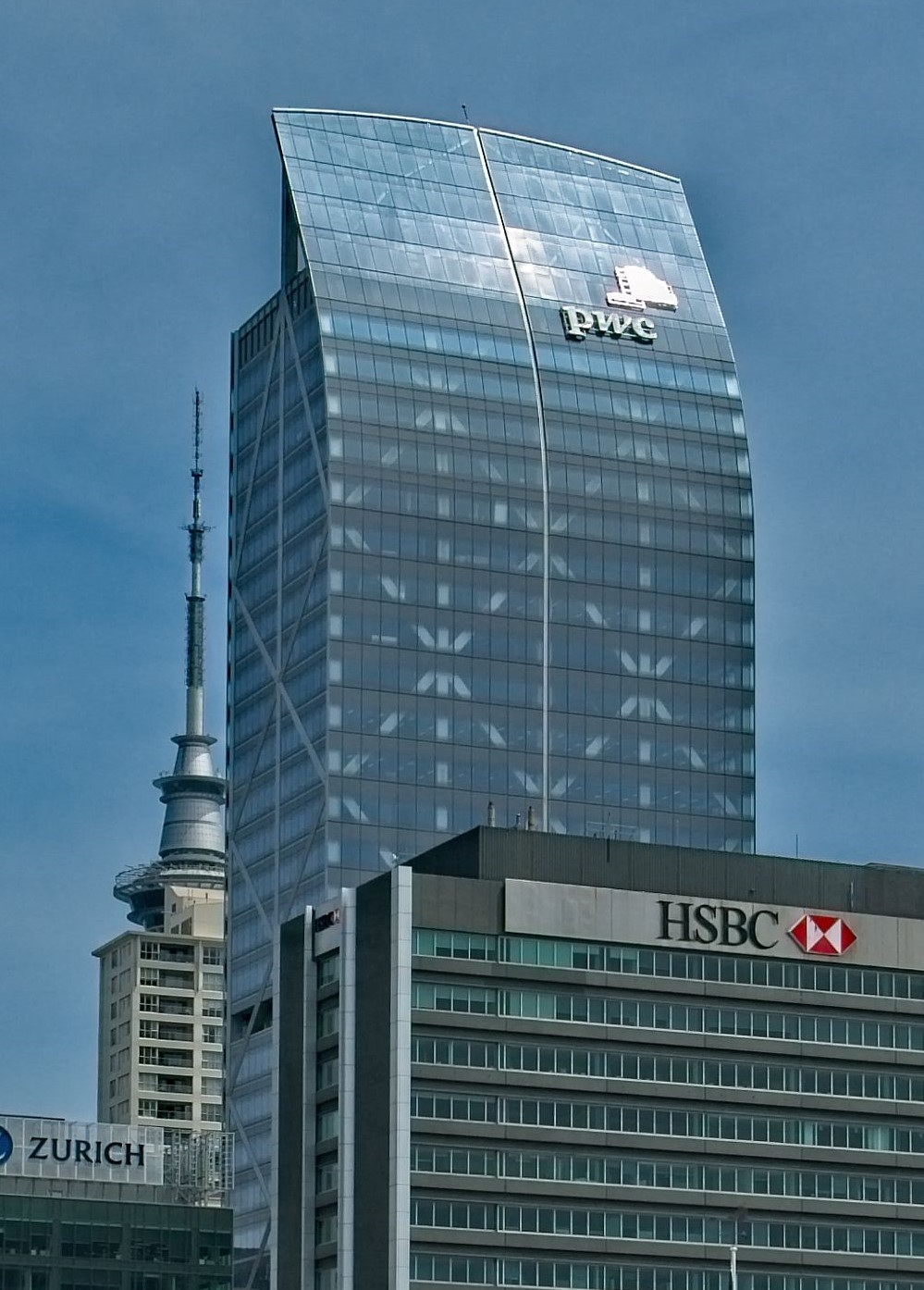
The PWC Tower at Commercial Bay

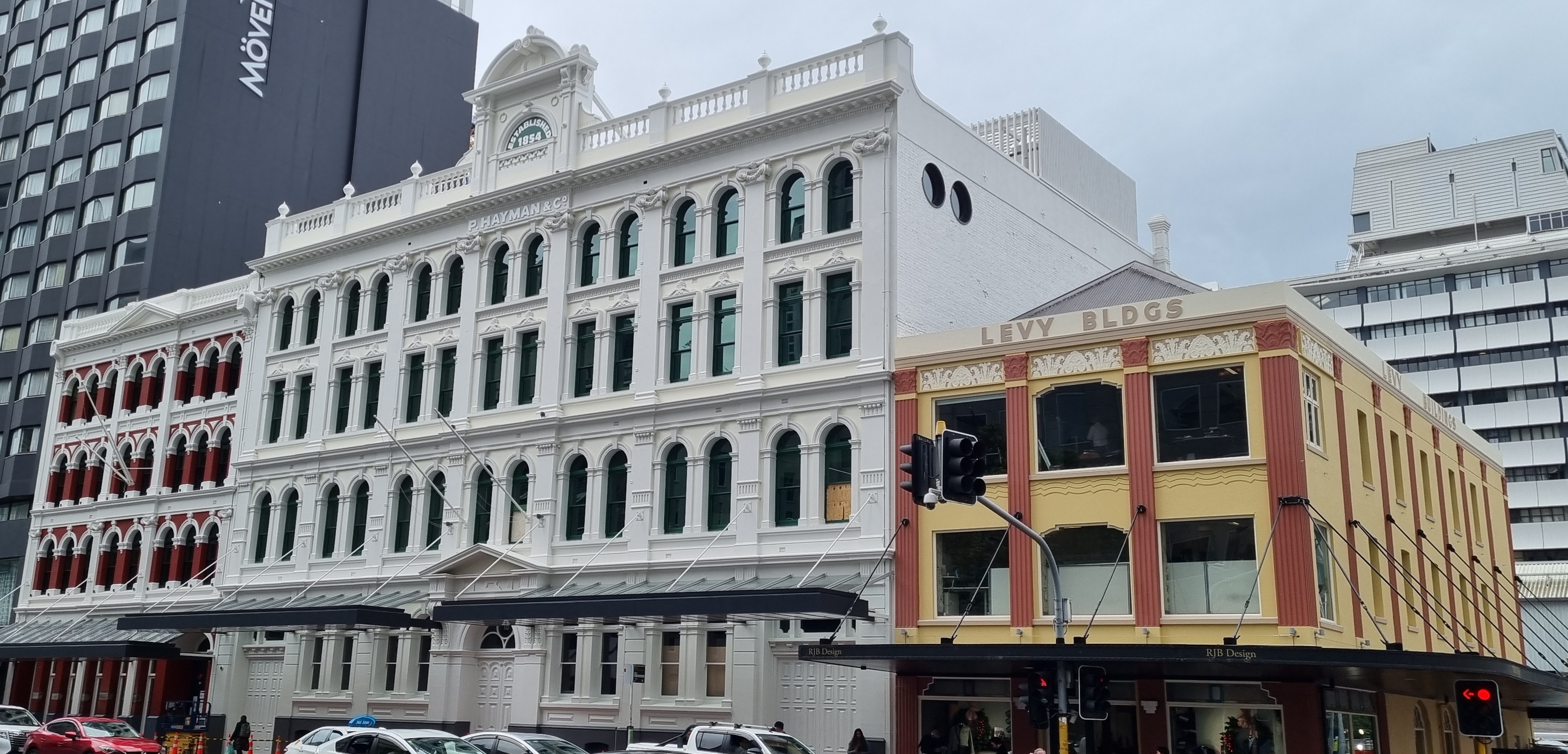
Heritage buildings on Customs Street East

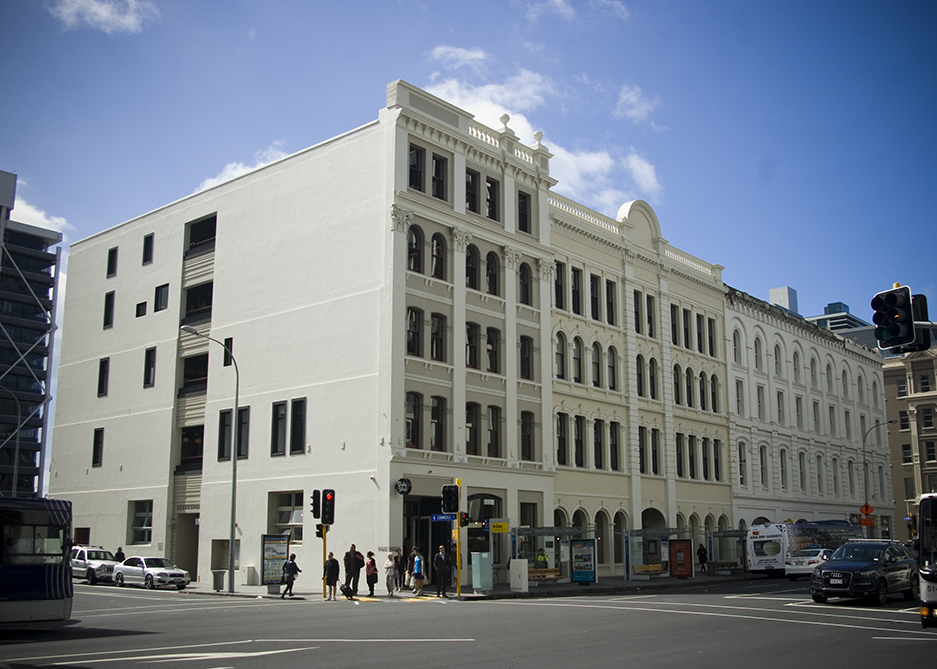
Excelsior Building, Stanbeth House and Masonic Club

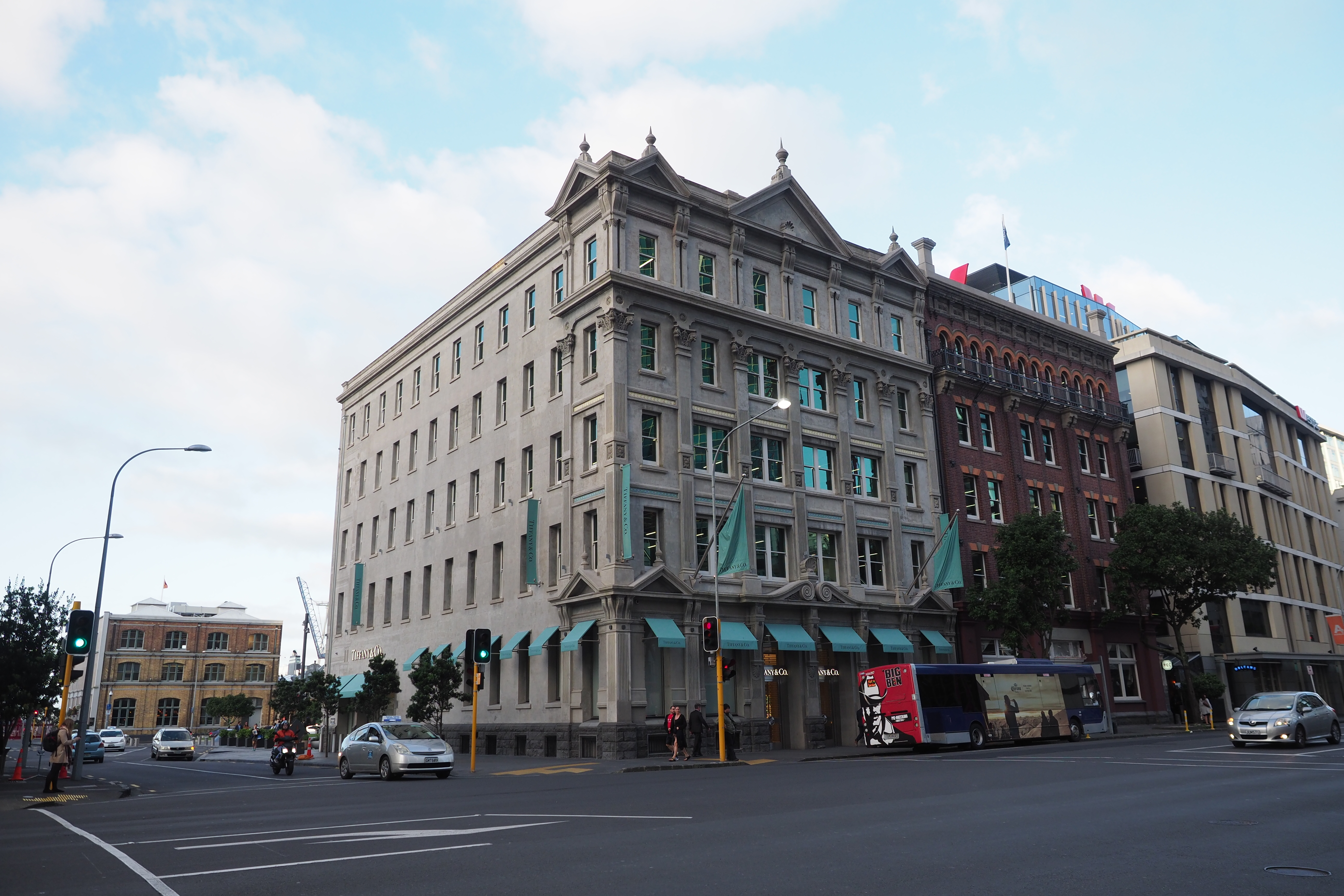
Australis House and Arthur H. Nathan Warehouse (architect Arthur Pollard Wilson, who also designed Strand Arcade, Naval and Family Hotel, Northern Steam Ship Company Building and Isaacs’ Bonded Stores)

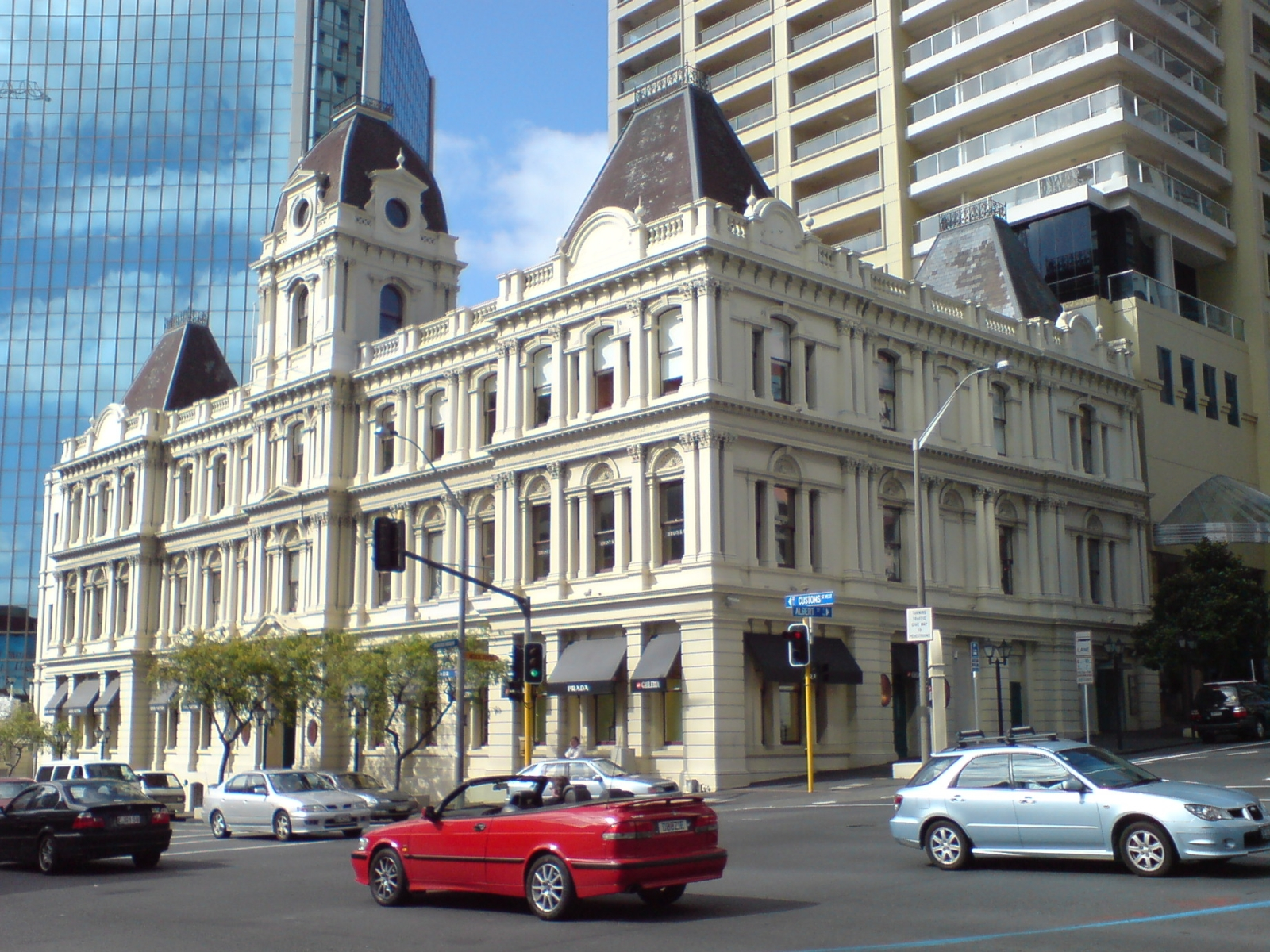
The former Customhouse

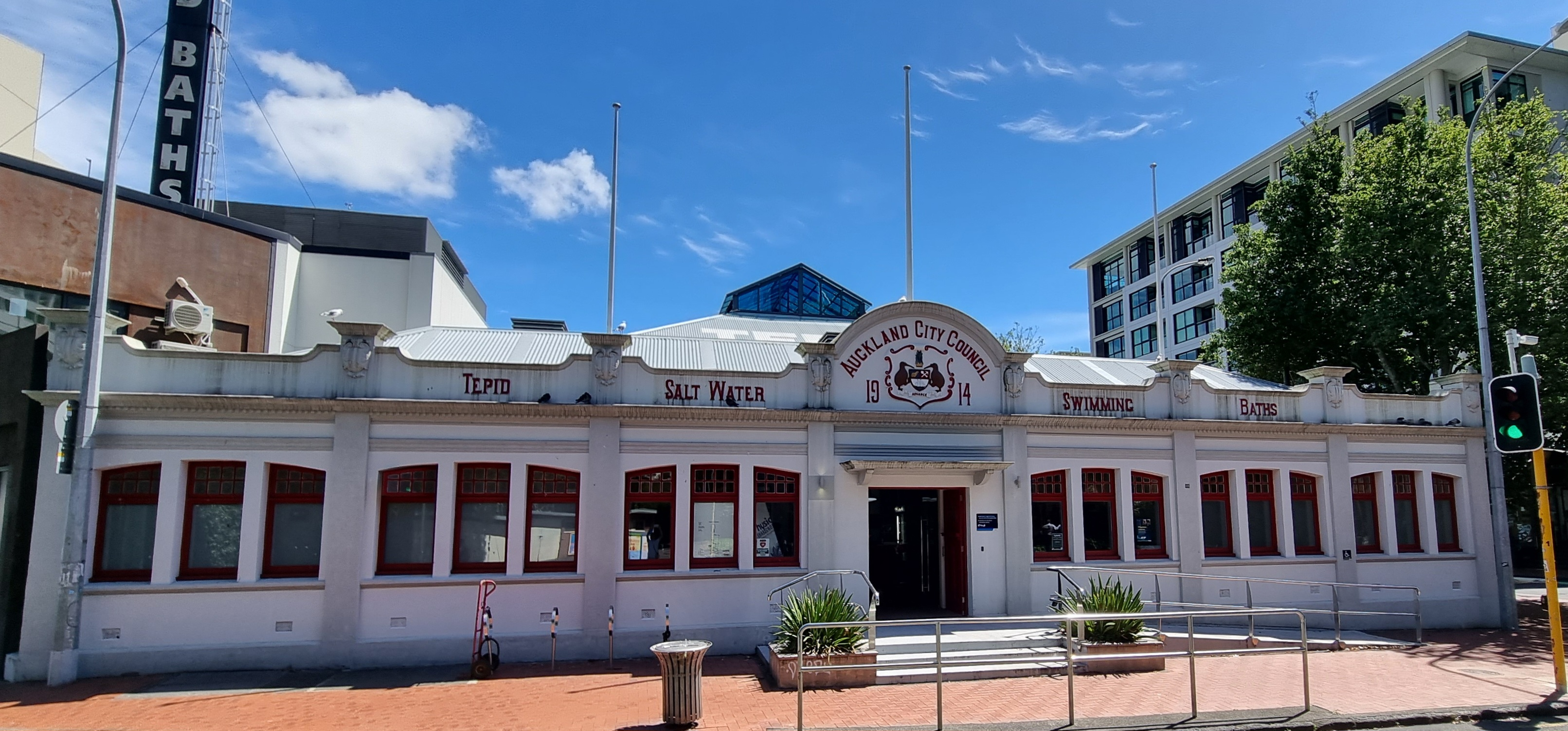
Tepid Baths on Customs Street West
