= Auckland CBD =

Central business district in New Zealand

Coordinates: 36.847°S 174.765°E

- Central business district
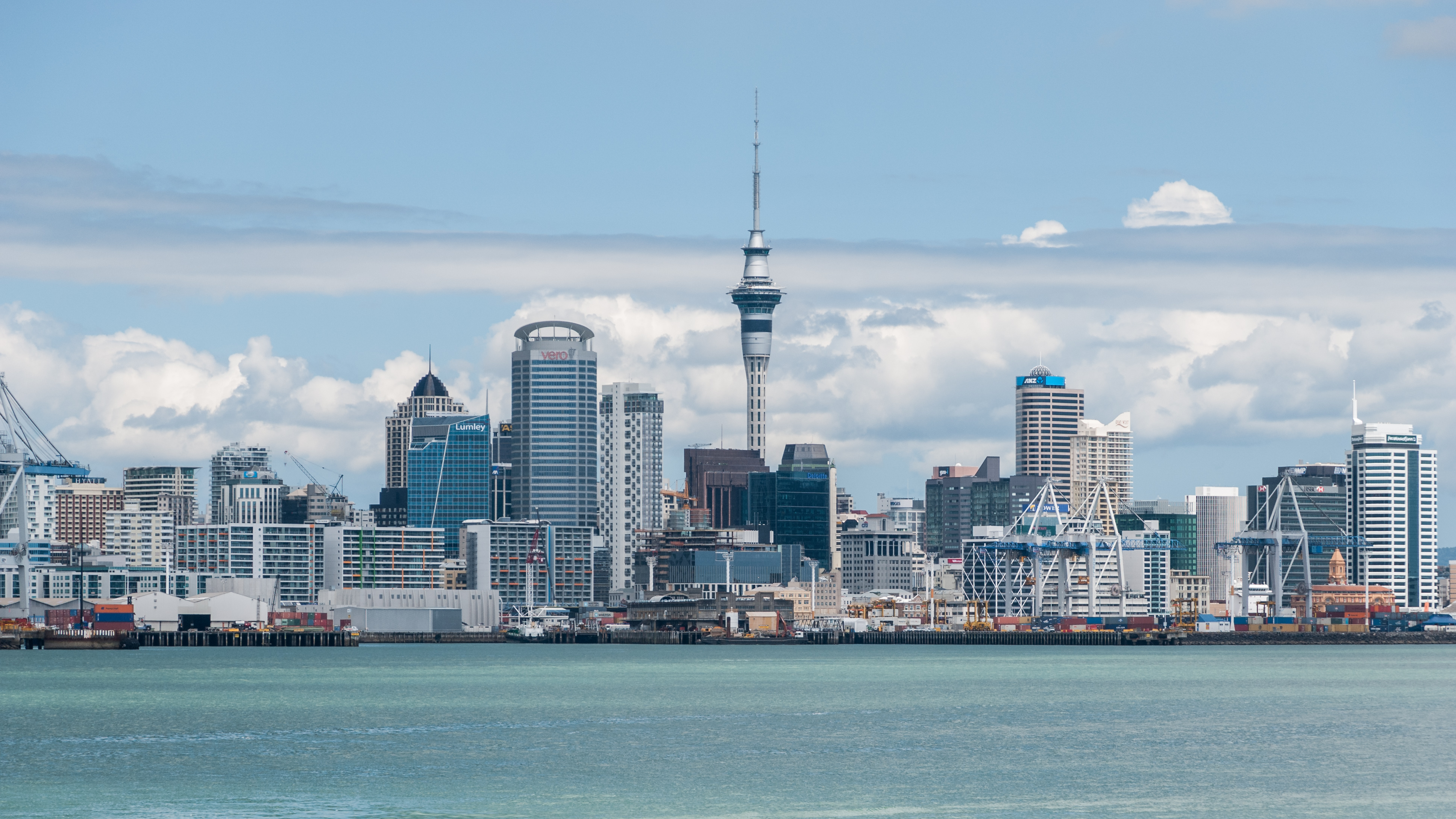
- The Auckland CBD viewed from Devonport

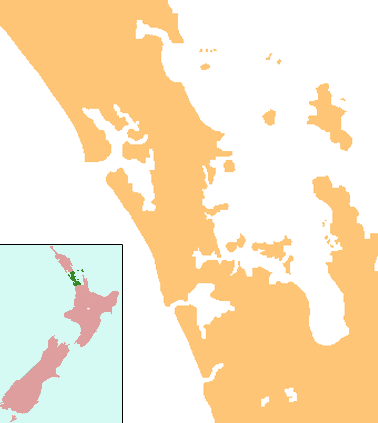
- Auckland CBD is located in the Auckland Region

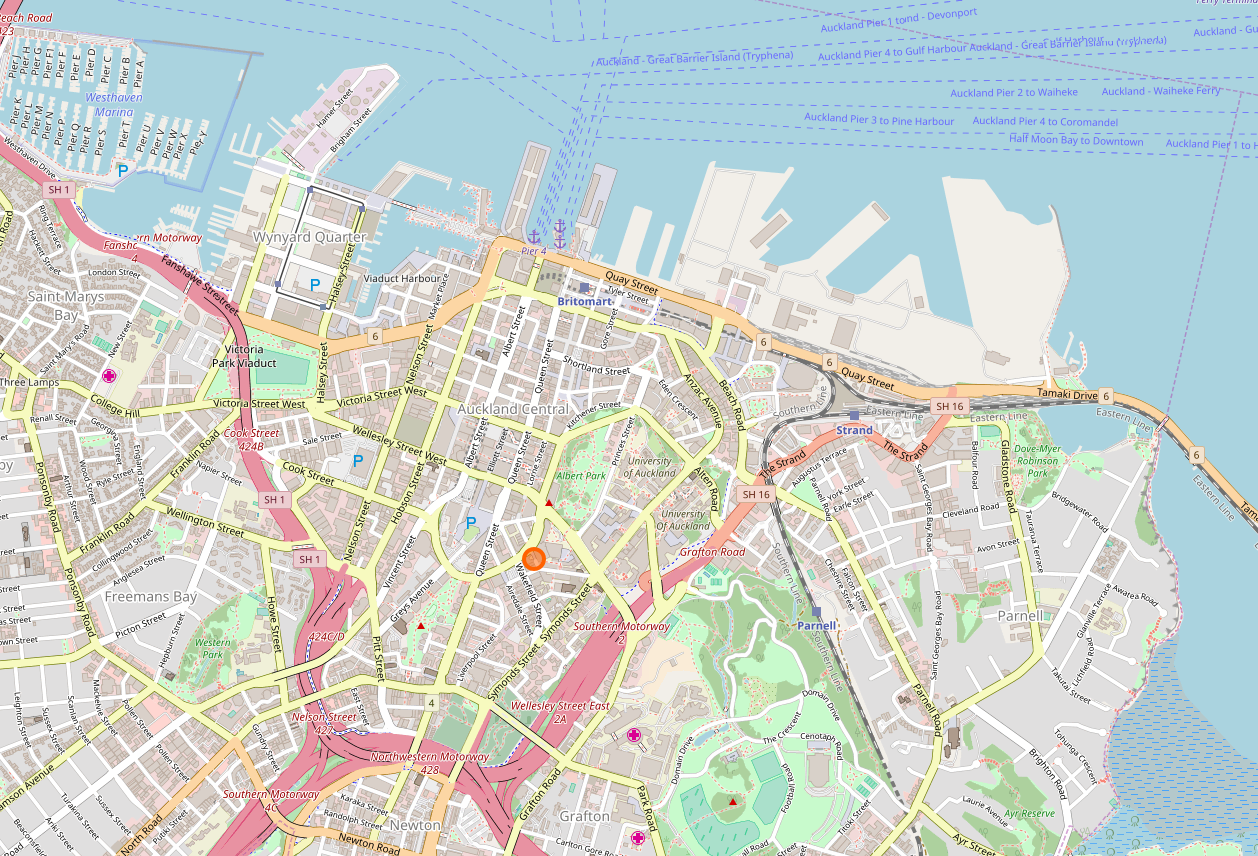
- Country: New Zealand
- Local authority: Auckland Council
- European settlement established: 1840

Area
  - Total: 4.42 km^{2} (1.71 sq mi)

Population (June 2025)
  - Total: 38,110
  - Density: 8,620/km^{2} (22,300/sq mi)

The Auckland Central Business District (CBD), or Auckland city centre, is the geographical and economic heart of the Auckland metropolitan area. It is the area in which Auckland was established in 1840, by William Hobson on land gifted by mana whenua hapū Ngāti Whātua Ōrākei. It is New Zealand's leading financial hub, and the centre of the country's economy; the GDP of the Auckland Region was NZD$167 billion in the year ending March 2026.

The CBD is one of the most densely developed places in New Zealand, with many commercial and some residential developments packed into a space of only 433 hectares (1,070 acres). The area is made up of the city's largest concentration of skyscrapers and businesses. Bounded by several major motorways and the harbour coastline to the north, it is surrounded further out by mostly suburban areas; it is bounded to the north by Waitematā Harbour, east by Parnell, southeast by Grafton, south by Mount Eden, southwest by Newton, west by Freemans Bay and northwest by Viaduct Harbour.

== Geography ==
Located on the northern shore of a narrow isthmus, the CBD extends from the Auckland waterfront on the Waitematā Harbour southwards along Queen Street and a number of other parallel-running streets. The CBD is generally considered to be bounded by the main motorways that surround all non-harbour sides, with State Highway 1 forming the southern and western boundaries, and State Highway 16 / Grafton Gully forming the eastern boundary.

The CBD has an area of 433 hectares (1,070 acres), similar to the Sydney CBD, and twice as large as the CBDs of Wellington and Christchurch. The CBD is to a substantial part located on reclaimed land of the Waitematā Harbour. For a closer discussion of this aspect, see the Commercial Bay and Auckland waterfront articles.

== History ==
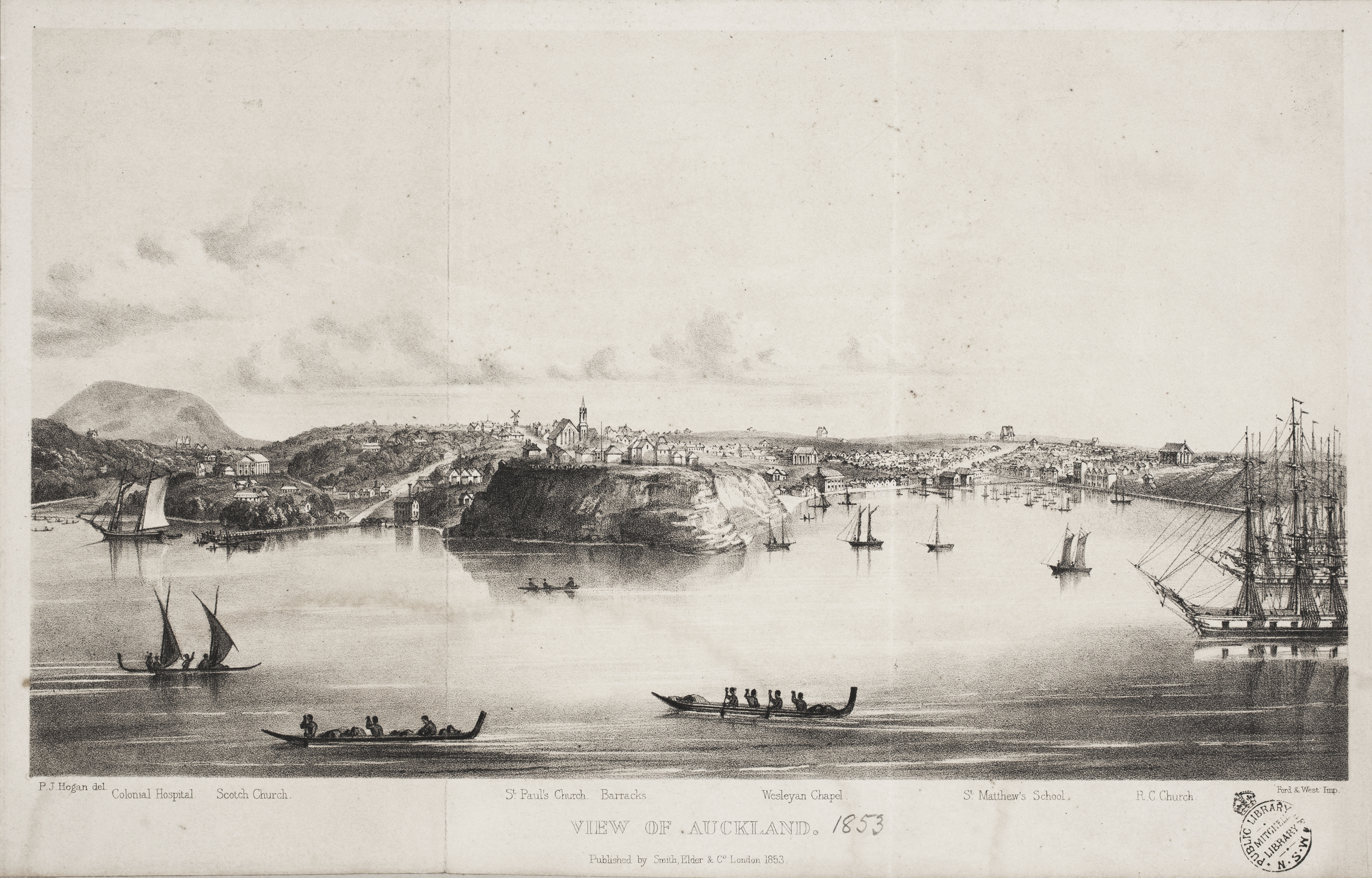
The Auckland waterfront with Māori waka and the original St Paul's Church building above Point Britomart, painted in 1852.

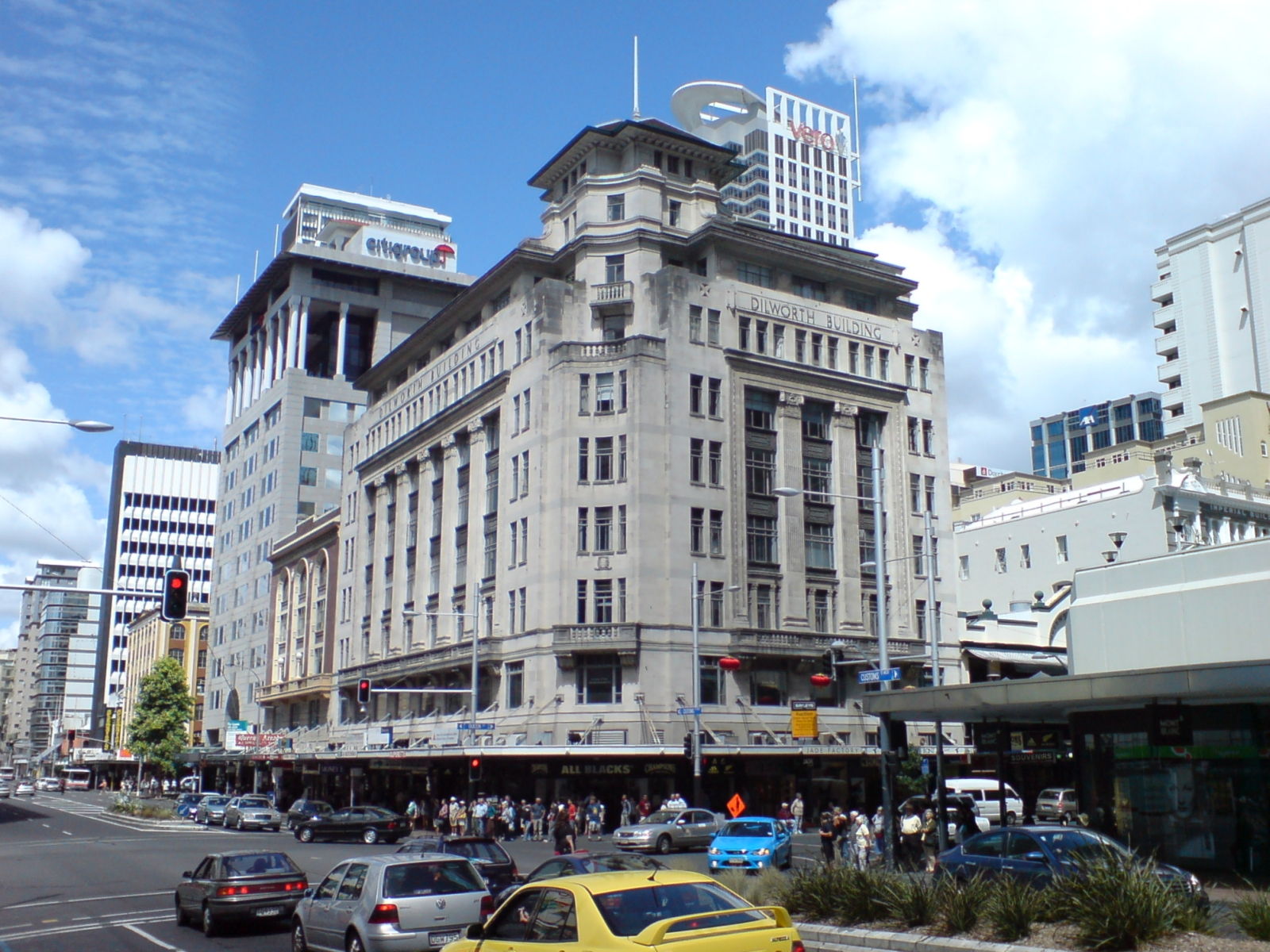
The Dilworth Building, one of the few remaining stately older buildings along Queen Street

On 20 March 1840, paramount chief of the Ngāti Whātua Māori iwi (tribe) of Auckland Apihai Te Kawau, signed the Treaty of Waitangi. Ngāti Whātua sought British protection from Ngāpuhi as well as a reciprocal relationship with the Crown and the Church. Soon after signing the treaty, Ngāti Whātua Ōrākei made a strategic gift of 3,500 acres (1,400 ha) of land on the Waitematā Harbour to the new Governor of New Zealand, William Hobson, for the new capital, which Hobson named for George Eden, Earl of Auckland, then Viceroy of India. Auckland was founded on 18 September 1840 and was officially declared New Zealand's capital in 1841.

The town of Auckland was created in 1840 with the first European colonisation of the area, marked by an official ceremony on the now non-existent Point Britomart. The initial centre of the new town was focused on what is now the corner of Shortland and Queen Street, which was at the shoreline of Commercial Bay. From approximately their junction, the main wharf ran north off the end of Queen Street, with Shortland Street leading up to St Paul's Church, Fort Britomart and Government House, around which many of the richer people built houses. Shortland Street tended to be the location of the more important businesses and most of the 'luxury' shops of the mid 19th century. The 1850s onwards saw an increasing number of businesses, and especially retail, locating further south along Queen Street, which still to this day forms the 'spine' of the area.

In 1841, one year after the European founding, the census counted approximately 2,000 people, with "mechanics" the largest group at 250, and other groups of note being 150 agricultural labourers, 100 shopkeepers, 100 domestic servants, and 125 "upper class members".

During the remainder of the 19th century, Commercial Bay was progressively filled in, allowing a northward extension of Queen Street and the creation of Fort Street, Customs Street, and Quay Street. The part of Queen Street north of Customs Street is today referred to informally as Lower Queen Street.

As well as being the location of a great many multi-storey warehouses, initially the Lower Queen Street area also contained many manufacturing businesses, though many of these started to move to other areas such as Freeman's Bay, Newton and Parnell, especially if they took up a large area (such as timber yards) or created noise or pollution (such as brick yards or foundries). Up until the middle of the 20th century the centre of town still contained a large number of small factories including clothing manufacturers.

The relocation of industries to outlying suburbs became especially pronounced in the 1950s, partly due to incentives made by council planners to create industrial areas in Penrose and Rosebank Road (amongst others) and thus rid the inner city area of noise, pollution and heavy traffic. This was mirrored by the development of suburban shopping malls which enticed retailers to vacate the inner city as well. Attempts by the council to halt this pattern by constructing numerous public car parking buildings met with varying success. The rise of suburban supermarket and mall shopping that was created in places such as Pakuranga from 1965 onwards has been added to by the appearance of Big Box retailers in places such as Botany and the North Shore.

Residential numbers in the inner city (including the inner suburbs) were also declining in the 20th century. In the two-mile zone surrounding the CBD, there were approximately 70,000 people in 1926, with only around 50,000 in 1966 – a change made even more marked by the development of the remainder of Auckland's population, which grew more than fourfold in the same timeframe. In the 1990s, only a token population of around 1,400 was still residing within the CBD, though this was to grow substantially with a boom of new apartment buildings around the turn of the millennium. More recently, in the early 21st century the CBD has seen a resurgence with strong population growth. According to CBRE New Zealand in March 2023, the CBD had 21,253 apartment units with a further 20,604 units in Auckland's surrounding suburbs and city fringe.

== Characteristics ==
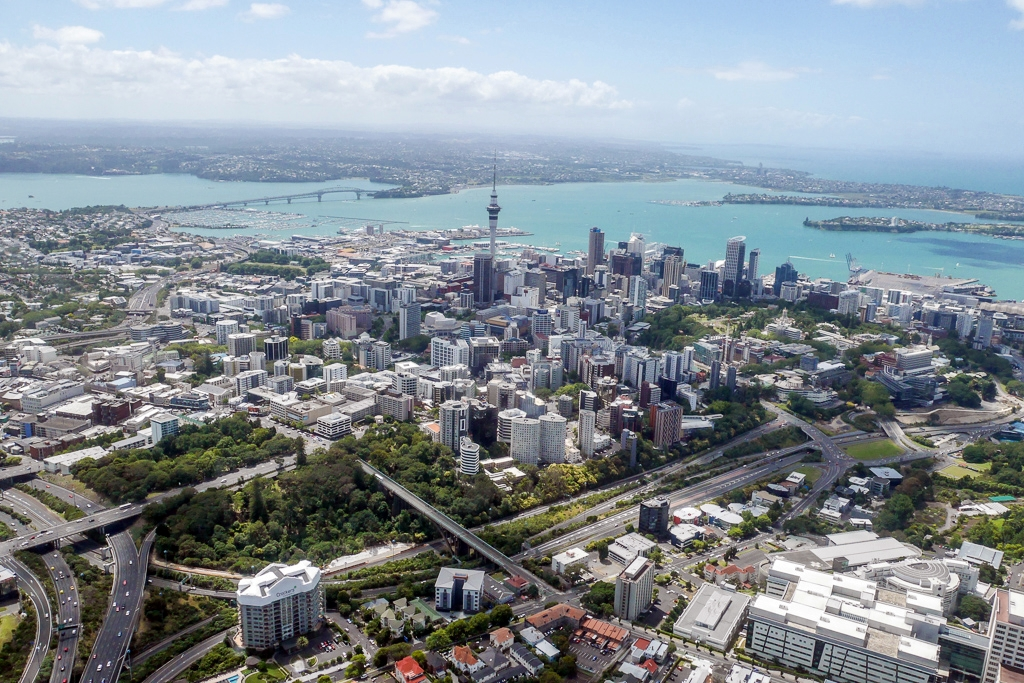
Aerial view of the CBD, CMJ is just to the left and the very bottom

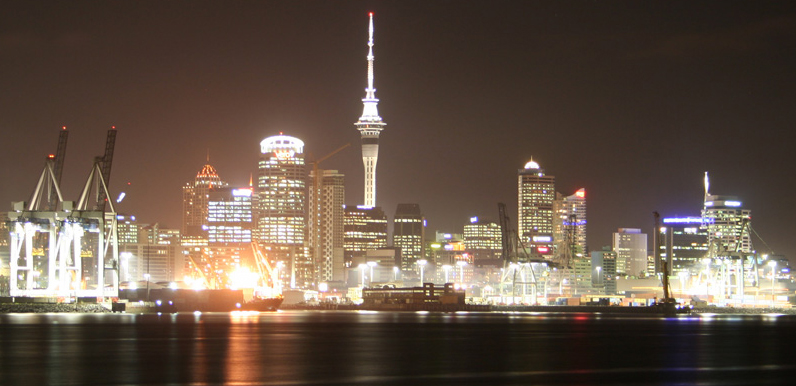
The CBD economy is dominated by Ports of Auckland and by business and financial support services.

=== Overview ===
The CBD of Auckland has been the leading centre of New Zealand's business and economic development for nearly two centuries. The area of today's CBD was the site of the original European settlement of Auckland, oriented along the coastline and then Queen Street, in a southward direction. From those origins, it has grown progressively, and become much more densely built-up, now being an area of high-rise buildings mainly used for commercial and retail uses. It has the highest concentration of arts, culture and higher education institutions and venues in the country.

Some commentators have noted that the recent decades have not been kind to the aesthetics and the community values of the inner city. The demolishing of many older buildings, often the prerequisite for low-quality or uninspired new office and residential developments, is considered by them to be due to a combination of developers uninterested in long-term outcomes and council planning direction being too weak.

In an attempt to reverse the decline of aesthetics in the CBD, previous Auckland City Councils and the current unitary Auckland Council have instigated several urban regeneration schemes. These include the recent redevelopment of Aotea Square in 2010 and the upgrade of Saint Patrick's Square in 2009.

The area east of the Waitematā railway station is currently undergoing major changes, with the development of new commercial buildings, the restoration of several heritage buildings and development of public spaces, including a new public square named Te Komititanga which opened in 2020. The downtown ferry precinct called Te Wanaga opened in 2021. Another major regeneration scheme currently underway is the redevelopment of Wynyard Quarter, which involves replacing industrial facilities covering a large portion of the CBD waterfront with residential or commercial buildings and public spaces.

The Auckland CBD is one of the few places in New Zealand that has skyscraper-sized buildings, such as the Vero Centre, PwC Tower at Commercial Bay, ANZ Centre, the Metropolis, with the Sky Tower rising above them.

=== Population ===
Auckland City Centre covers 4.42 km^{2} (1.71 sq mi) and had an estimated population of 38,110 as of June 2025, with a population density of 8,622 people per km^{2}.

Historical population
| Year | Pop. | ±% p.a. |
|---|---|---|
| 1991 | 1,400 | — |
| 2001 | 8,977 | +20.42% |
| 2006 | 20,004 | +17.38% |
| 2013 | 29,712 | +5.81% |
| 2018 | 33,219 | +2.26% |
| 2023 | 33,417 | +0.12% |
Populations before 2013 may be for a smaller area. Source:

Auckland City Centre had a population of 33,417 in the 2023 New Zealand census, an increase of 198 people (0.6%) since the 2018 census, and an increase of 3,705 people (12.5%) since the 2013 census. There were 17,061 males, 15,996 females and 360 people of other genders in 18,114 dwellings. 11.5% of people identified as LGBTIQ+. The median age was 30.7 years (compared with 38.1 years nationally). There were 1,554 people (4.7%) aged under 15 years, 14,409 (43.1%) aged 15 to 29, 15,435 (46.2%) aged 30 to 64, and 2,022 (6.1%) aged 65 or older.

People could identify as more than one ethnicity. The results were 39.6% European (Pākehā); 8.0% Māori; 5.0% Pasifika; 49.4% Asian; 6.5% Middle Eastern, Latin American and African New Zealanders (MELAA); and 1.6% other, which includes people giving their ethnicity as "New Zealander". English was spoken by 94.6%, Māori language by 2.1%, Samoan by 0.9%, and other languages by 44.9%. No language could be spoken by 1.2% (e.g. too young to talk). New Zealand Sign Language was known by 0.4%. The percentage of people born overseas was 64.5, compared with 28.8% nationally.

Religious affiliations were 23.5% Christian, 7.1% Hindu, 3.3% Islam, 0.5% Māori religious beliefs, 3.7% Buddhist, 0.6% New Age, 0.2% Jewish, and 2.2% other religions. People who answered that they had no religion were 53.6%, and 5.5% of people did not answer the census question.

Of those at least 15 years old, 14,454 (45.4%) people had a bachelor's or higher degree, 10,794 (33.9%) had a post-high school certificate or diploma, and 6,621 (20.8%) people exclusively held high school qualifications. The median income was $39,400, compared with $41,500 nationally. 4,284 people (13.4%) earned over $100,000 compared to 12.1% nationally. The employment status of those at least 15 was that 16,896 (53.0%) people were employed full-time, 4,308 (13.5%) were part-time, and 1,668 (5.2%) were unemployed.

Residential high-density buildings constructed since the 1990s have helped to substantially increase the population living in the CBD. Much of this growth has been driven by immigration to New Zealand, particularly from Asia, and the CBD is the area in New Zealand with the highest percentage share (32%) of the Asian ethnic group in New Zealand. Also striking is the high number of students (both tertiary education and overseas students studying English in one of the many institutes), making up 27% of all residents (2001 Census) and contributing to the relative youth of the city residents.

With increasing population, available services have also changed – from only about one superette in the early 2000s, this has ballooned to one supermarket and 38 superettes by 2011. In early 2012, two major supermarket chains opened a branch in the city centre, with Countdown opening on Victoria Street in January and New World opening a branch on Queen Street in early March. However, the population remains highly focused on ethnically diverse, mostly young and childless residents.

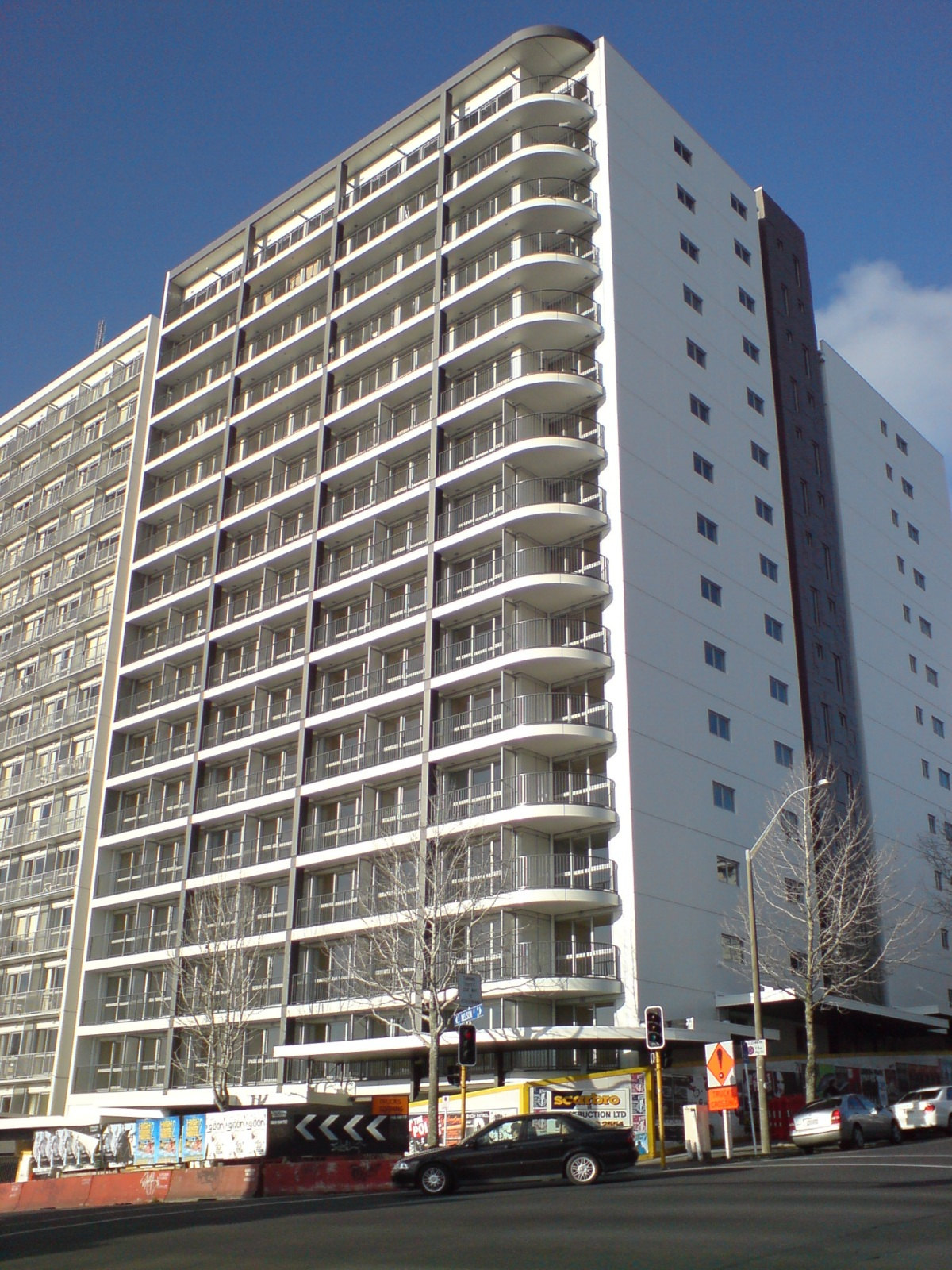
Late 2000s apartment block on Nelson Street, considered by some to be an "eyesore". Many of these buildings saw strong criticism – and sometimes lack of tenant interest – due to perceived problems with building quality, lack of urban design and too-small unit sizes (with a bylaw banning very small units coming in only in 2005).

== Economy ==
In 2024, the Auckland CBD had an estimated 38280 residents, 158931 workers (15.9% of Auckland), 15501 businesses (6.7% of Auckland), and 53860 university students. The CBD accounts for 18% of all businesses in Auckland City, with the largest being Ports of Auckland, and the largest employment sectors being financial services, business and ICT services. The CBD is also the largest employment centre in New Zealand, with around 65,000 jobs, representing 13% of the regional workforce, and 25% of the Auckland City workforce. Around 73,000 people enter the CBD every morning between 7 am and 9 am, 60% of these by car, while the total 'turnover' is around 270,000 people per day.

In 2003 many large corporations were housed in the Auckland CBD. During the same year, an Auckland City report stated that the Auckland CBD, compared to several central business districts in Australia, had "a broader and more dominant role in its regional economy" compared to the economies of the Australian central business districts.

The CBD remains attractive to shops, partially due to the very high pedestrian numbers on the main shopping streets like Queen Street, where footfalls are estimated to be up to 10 times as high as on Broadway in Newmarket, seen as Queen Street's closest rival.

Auckland CBD has a higher share of employment in large firms than other areas in Auckland. Over half of the large firms in Auckland CBD are in office-based sectors (such as property and business services and finance and insurance) and are in the Downtown and Waterfront areas of the CBD. In 2004 Auckland CBD had 72,540 employees and 9125 businesses. 2006 Auckland CBD had 78,444 employees and 9,461 businesses.

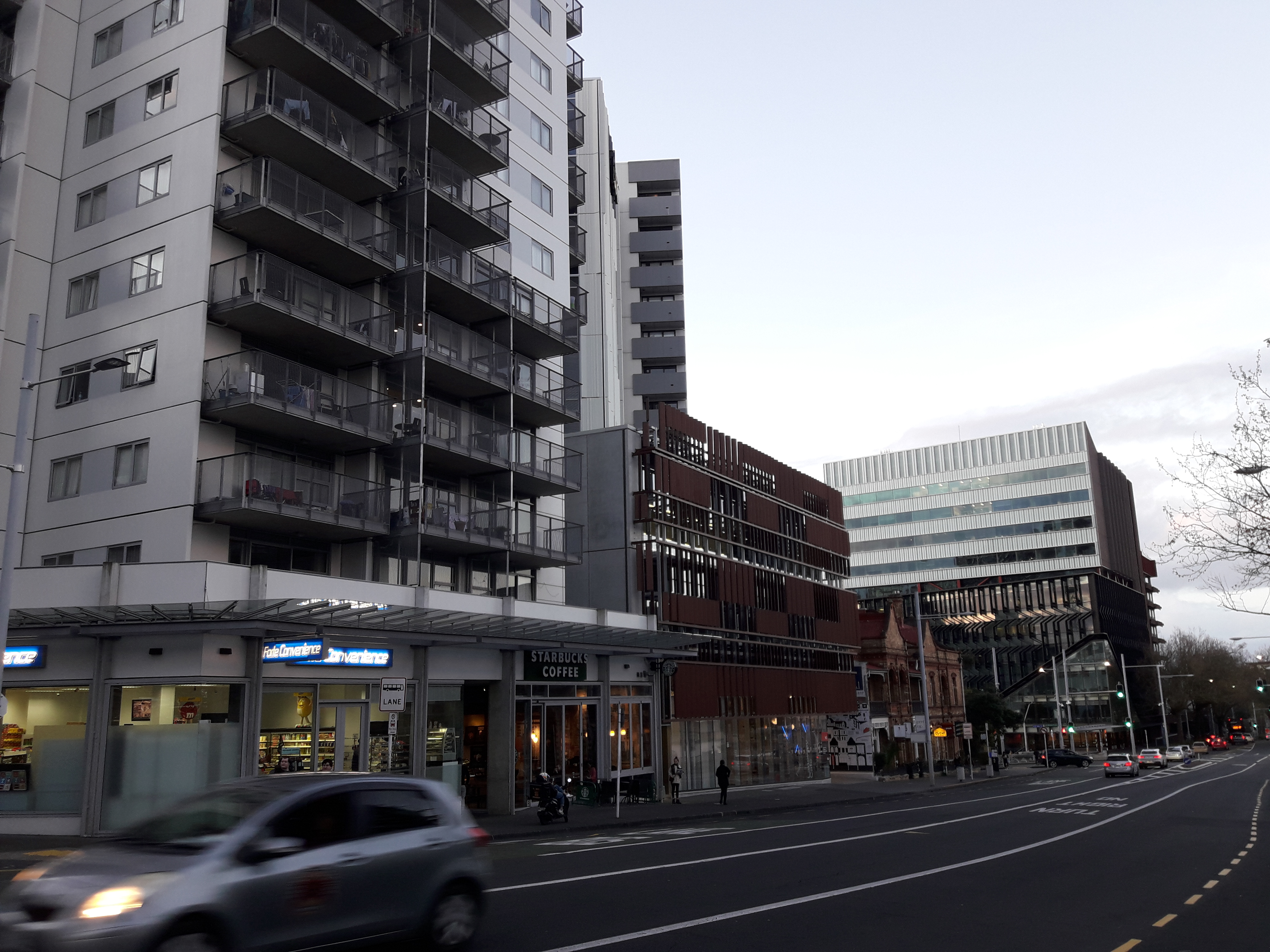
Symonds Street of the Auckland CBD overlooking the Auckland University of Technology (middle) and the University of Auckland (right).

Air New Zealand was formerly headquartered in Auckland CBD. In 2006, from late September to early October, the airline moved employees out of the four buildings it occupied in Auckland CBD and relocated them to the new headquarters in the Wynyard Quarter. In September 2003 Air New Zealand was the only one of the very largest corporations in New Zealand to have its headquarters within the Auckland CBD.

=== Retail ===
The CBD's main shopping mall, Commercial Bay, opened in 2020. It features 18,000 m^{2} of lettable real estate space, made up of 120 shops including H&M. It replaced the older Westfield Downtown Plaza in the same location.

The Atrium on Elliott has 736 carparks and 23 stores, including The Warehouse, Rebel Sport and the Elliott Stables Foodcourt.

The Victoria Park Market was established as a shopping centre in an unused heritage building in 1983. It was extensively renovated between 2008 and 2013. The centre currently features 74 stores, and 194 carparks.

=== Museums and galleries ===
Auckland Art Gallery Toi o Tāmaki has been operating in Auckland CBD in 1888.

Since then, several other galleries have also opened in the CBD. Artspace Aotearoa opened in 1987. Gus Fisher Gallery opened in 2001. St Paul St Gallery opened in 2004.

The Dalmatian Archives and Museum, opened in 1989, features the history of Croatian New Zealanders.

The New Zealand Maritime Museum, opened in 1993, features the maritime history of the Waitematā Harbour.

== Education ==
There are significant educational institutions located in the Auckland CBD, notably the University of Auckland and the Auckland University of Technology. The CBD also has many of the English language schools for non-native English speakers which form a significant part of Auckland's education business.

The Ministry of Education operates state-operated schools throughout the area. Private secondary schools within the CBD include ACG New Zealand International College, ACG Senior College, and Auckland International College.

== Religion ==
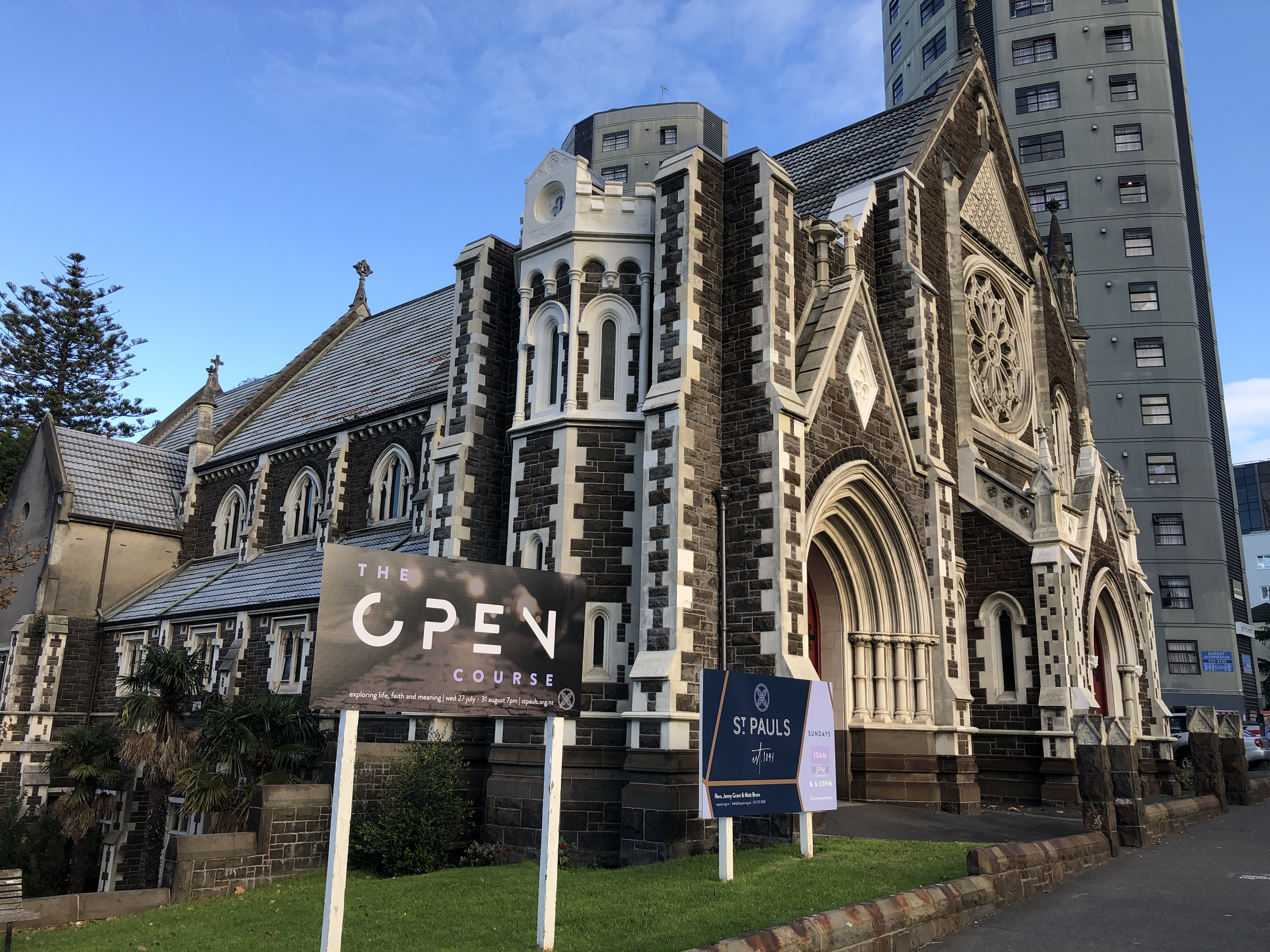
Now occupying its third building, St Paul's is known as the 'Mother Church' of Auckland as it is the oldest church community in the city, founded within a year of the foundation of the city.

Many of Auckland's historic Christian churches are located in the CBD, although not all are the original buildings. Heritage New Zealand Category 1 Historic Place registered churches include: St Paul's Anglican Church, founded in 1841, St Patrick's Catholic Cathedral was originally built in 1843, St Stephen's Anglican Chapel was originally built in 1844, St Andrew's First Presbyterian Church was built in 1850, Auckland Baptist Tabernacle, founded 1855 and St Matthew's Anglican Church was founded in 1902.

== Transport ==
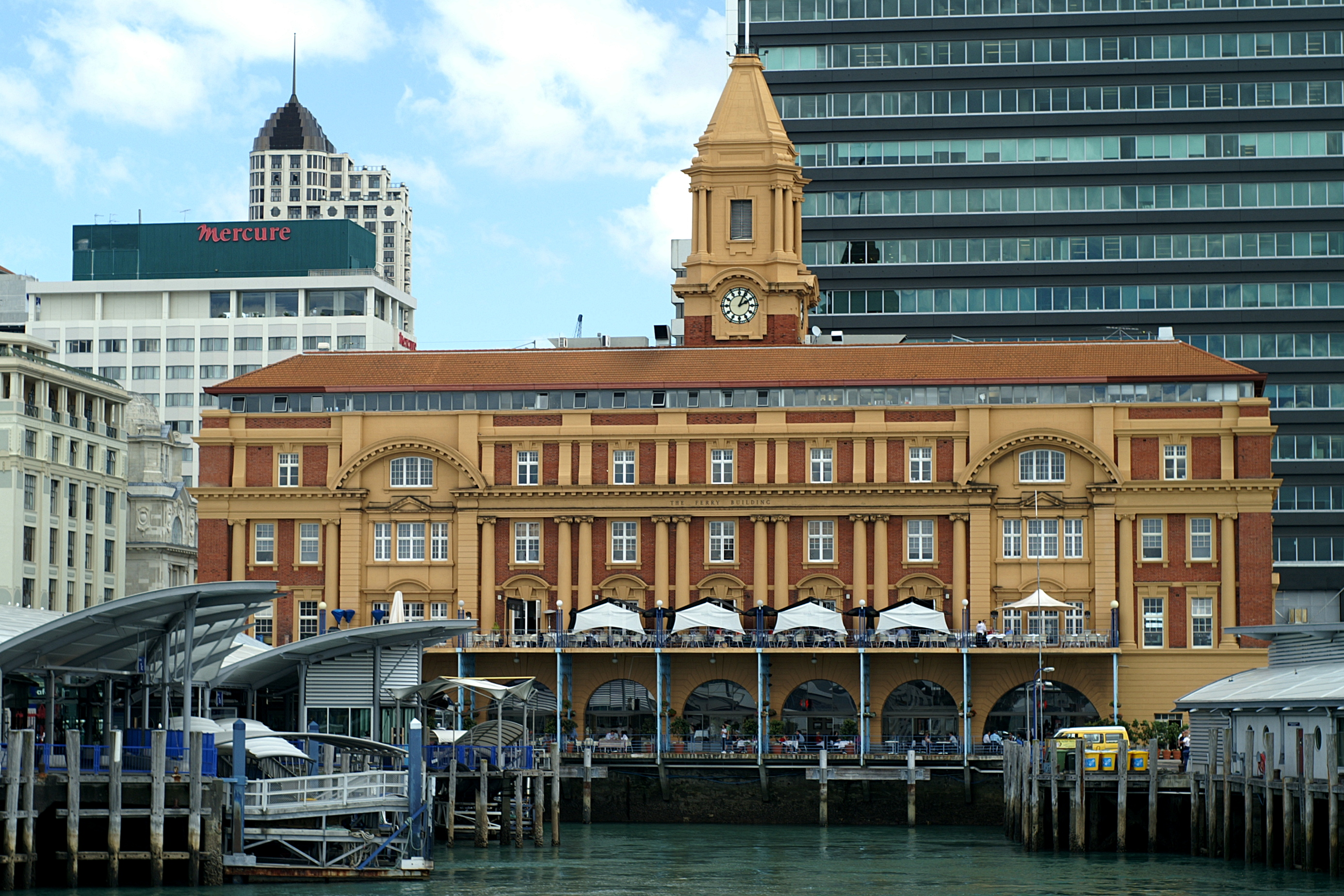
The Auckland Ferry Terminal on the waterfront

The CBD, with its substantial employment, and increasing number of residents, contains the main public transport hubs of the city, administered by Auckland Transport. These services are concentrated around Waitematā and Te Waihorotiu railway station (rail and buses) and Auckland Ferry Terminal. Many bus services travel the length of the CBD along the main streets, in particular via the bus lanes on Albert Street and the Central Connector bus priority route. In 2010, around 33,000 people entered the CBD via public transport every day.

Historically, much of the transport to and around the CBD post-1950s was by private vehicles, partly because the CBD provides numerous parking buildings and parking spaces associated with office buildings, and is almost totally surrounded (and easily accessible) by motorways, administered by Waka Kotahi.

Auckland Council, the New Zealand Government, Auckland Transport and KiwiRail oversaw construction of the City Rail Link from its commencement in 2016 to its completion in 2026. It connected Waitematā railway station to the Western Line in the vicinity of Maungawhau railway station by way of a tunnel running under the CBD. Two new stations were constructed, Karanga-a-Hape railway station near Karangahape Road, and Te Waihorotiu railway station near Aotea Square. The existing stations at each end of the link, Waitematā and Maungawhau, received substantial upgrades.

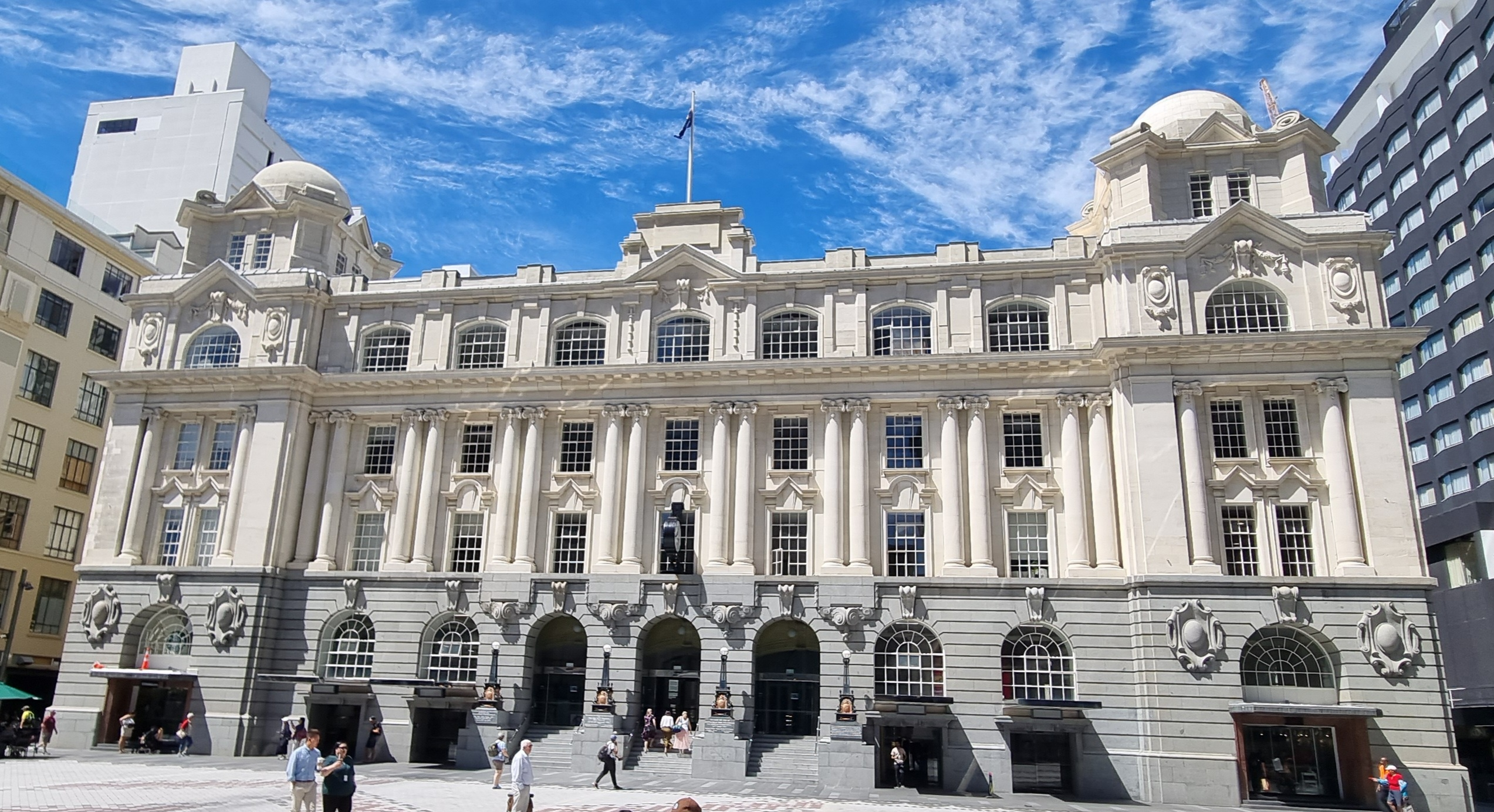
Britomart Station

The main street of the CBD is Queen Street, which was upgraded between 2006 and 2008 to modernise it and make it more pedestrian friendly. In 2009, the former Auckland City Council proposed the redevelopment of several CBD streets into shared spaces, with the goal of improving pedestrian and cyclist amenity by slowing down vehicle traffic while retaining the possibility for car access – compared to a pedestrian mall which allows no motor vehicles. Auckland Council is continuing this project. Darby Street, Lorne Street, Fort Street, Jean Batten Place, and Fort Lane have been converted into shared spaces since 2011. The portion of Federal Street between Wellesley Street West and Victoria Street West has also been made shared space.

== See also ==
- Auckland isthmus
- Auckland City
- Auckland waterfront
- Karangahape Road, a street which forms the southern boundary of the CBD.
- Queen Street, the main north–south street in the CBD.

== Illustrations ==
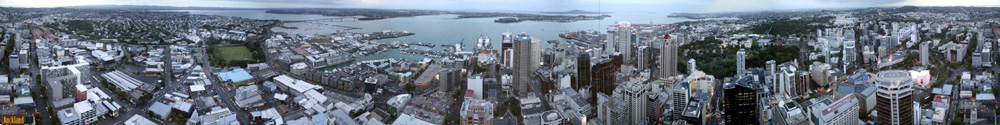
View over Auckland CBD from the Sky Tower

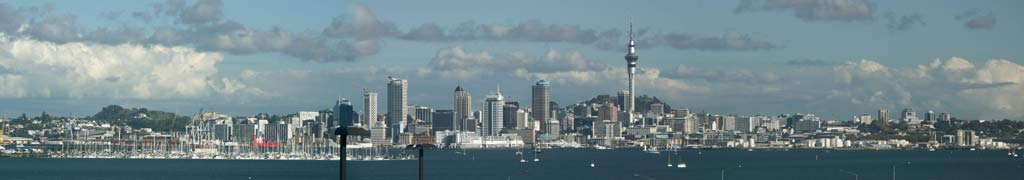
View of Auckland CBD from the North Shore
