= 2023 Auckland shooting =

Fatal mass shooting in New Zealand

- Location: 36°50′36″S 174°46′00″E; One Queen Street, Auckland, New Zealand
- Date: 20 July 2023; 07:20 am (NZST; UTC+12)
- Attack type: Mass shooting, workplace shooting, murder-suicide
- Weapon: Sawed-off 12-gauge Stoeger P350 Pump-action shotgun
- Deaths: 3 (including the perpetrator)
- Injuries: 10 (7 by gunfire)
- Perpetrator: Matu Tangi Matua Reid
- Motive: Suspected workplace grievance

On the morning of 20 July 2023, a mass shooting occurred at a building construction site in the central business district of Auckland. The shooter, 24-year-old Matu Tangi Matua Reid, killed two colleagues with a shotgun, wounded seven other people, including a police officer, and then killed himself.

== Incident ==
Matu Tangi Matua Reid entered the One Queen Street building in the Auckland CBD with a pump-action shotgun on 20 July 2023. The 21-storey building near the Commercial Bay Shopping Centre originally opened in 1973 and was undergoing renovations as part of the Commercial Bay redevelopment project, with the building planned to house offices and a hotel. Reid had been employed at the construction site, and the shooting is believed to have been related to his employment there.

Reid moved through the building and opened fire at about 7:20 am NZST, shooting and killing two construction workers who were his colleagues. Multiple other people were injured. One of the employees managed to rush people out of the building and call the police. Police arrived at 7:34 am, with the Armed Offenders Squad arriving four minutes later. Officers entered the building while Reid was shooting and eventually found him in the upper levels of the building, where he had barricaded himself in an elevator shaft. Reid fired at the police, hitting an officer, before the police fired back. Reid was later found dead from a self-inflicted gunshot. It was the deadliest mass shooting in the country since the 2019 Christchurch mosque shootings.

== Perpetrator ==
Reid had received a community-based sentence for an assault committed in 2020. He committed further offences in a domestic violence incident in 2021, while serving the earlier sentence. For that he was sentenced to five months' home detention in March 2023, for the offences of impeding breathing (strangulation), injuring with intent to injure, wilful damage and "male assaults female". He had already spent five months in custody awaiting sentencing and the length of his home detention had accordingly been reduced from what it would otherwise have been. He had approval to leave home to attend work during his detention. He did not hold a firearms licence.

== Responses ==
=== Emergency responses ===
The immediate area around the Queen Street / Quay Street intersection was put under lockdown. The shooting was noted due to being unusual in New Zealand.

New Zealand prime minister Chris Hipkins issued a press statement, saying that there was no national security risk, and there would be no change in the nation's terror threat level.

Auckland Transport, which operates a ferry terminal near to the location of the incident, as well as trains and buses, did not initially close the ferry service but did divert buses away from the nearby Britomart station. Later in the day, they announced that they would conduct a review of their response in terms of ensuring the safety of passengers, particularly in the case of the ferry.

On 21 July, Hato Hone St John Emergency Ambulance operations manager Stuart Cockburn confirmed that emergency responders had treated ten people, seven of whom had sustained gunshot wounds. One of the wounded was a police officer who had sustained "significant" injuries.

=== Investigations and recovery efforts ===
On 20 July, Hipkins confirmed that the New Zealand Police would launch a full investigation into the shooting, including how shooter Reid obtained the gun and whether there were any "red flags". That same day, the Department of Corrections launched an inquiry into its management of Reid's home detention.

By 23 July, the bodies of the two victims had been recovered by police. They were identified as Solomona Toʻotoʻo and Tupuga Sipiliano.

=== FIFA Women's World Cup ===
The shooting occurred on the day of the opening ceremony and first match of the 2023 FIFA Women's World Cup, which were taking place in Auckland. The competition was jointly hosted by Australia and New Zealand. The ceremony, and the match between New Zealand and Norway, took place as planned on the evening of 20 July at Eden Park; the venue heightened its security as a "reassurance" measure. In his initial address about the incident, Hipkins acknowledged that "clearly with the FIFA World Cup kicking off this evening there are a lot of eyes on Auckland", saying that the New Zealand government had been in conversation with FIFA and that the World Cup would go ahead as planned. A Football Australia representative said that the shooting was not related to the World Cup.

The incident took place outside the M Hotel, where the Norway team was staying ahead of the match, and close to the fan zone. Norway captain Maren Mjelde said that while members of the team were woken by police helicopters, they "felt safe the whole time"; other players had been having breakfast on the ground floor and were kept inside by security when the lockdown was being put in place. A team spokesperson said that Norway's match preparations were not affected. The Italy team, who were also staying in a nearby hotel, could not leave to attend training due to police cordons. Other national teams in Auckland were unaffected.

The FIFA Fan Festival, which had been planned to open on 20 July in Auckland CBD at The Cloud, was cancelled for the day with plans to open it at noon on 21 July. Minutes of silence were observed during the opening ceremonies (one in Auckland and one in Sydney, Australia) and before each of the opening matches in respect for the victims of the shooting.

== See also ==
- Murder of Matthew Hunt – 2020 shooting incident in Auckland
- 2021 Auckland supermarket stabbing
