= Commercial Bay Shopping Centre =

Shopping mall in Auckland, New Zealand

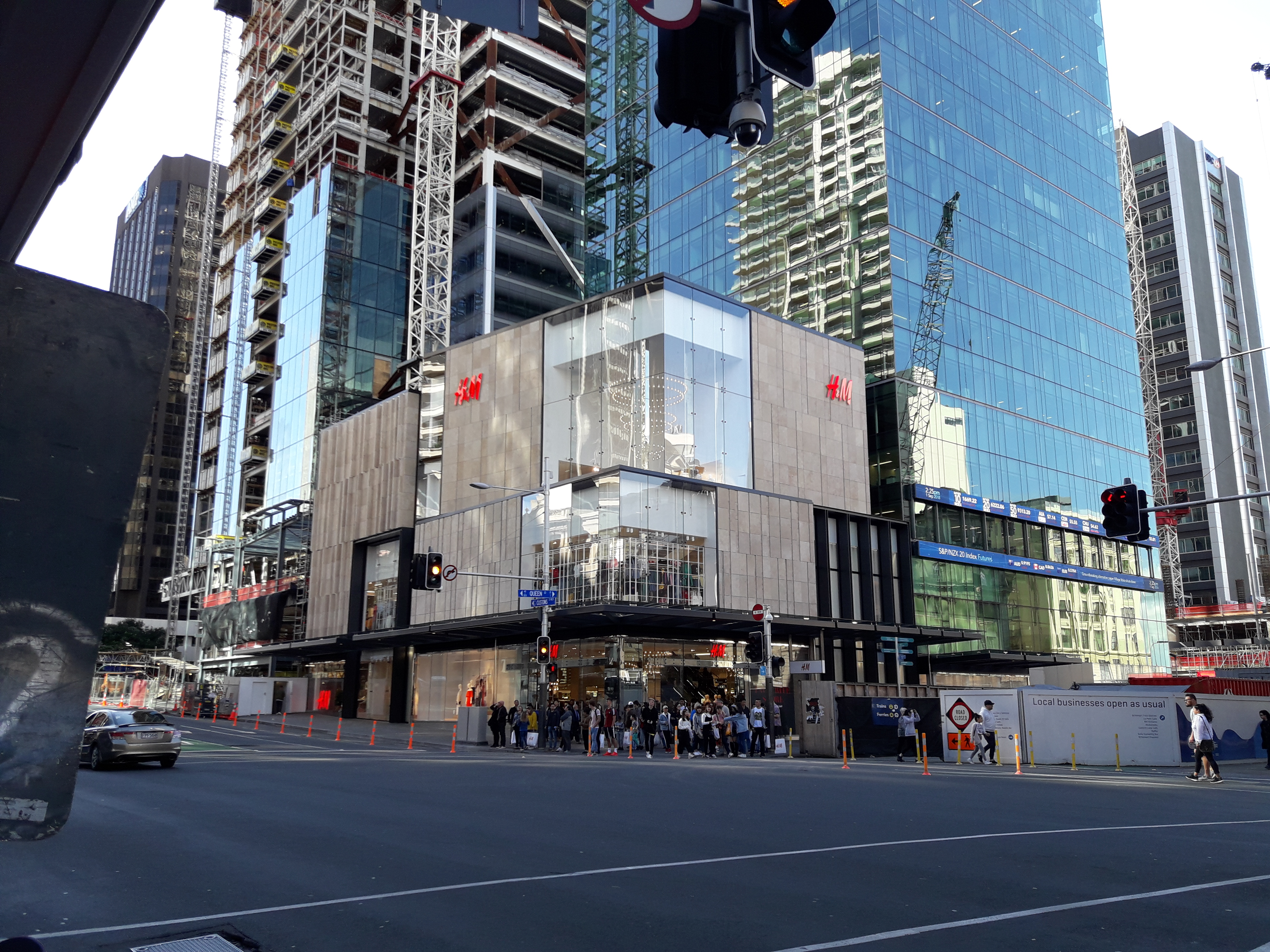
- The first shop, an H&M store, in the new Commercial Bay development in Auckland in 2018.
- Location: Auckland CBD
- Coordinates: 36°50′38″S 174°45′59″E
- Opened: June 28, 2020; 6 years ago
- Manager: Colliers International Real Estate Management
- Owner: Precinct Properties
- Num. of stores: 86 (original) 120+ (after rebuild)
- Num. of anchor tenants: 3 (original) 0 (after rebuild)
- Floor area: 12,417 m^{2} (133,660 sq ft)
- Floors: 3
- Parking: None
- Website: commercialbay.co.nz

Commercial Bay Shopping Centre is a shopping centre in the Auckland CBD, Auckland, New Zealand. It is situated at 11–19 Customs Street West between Lower Albert Street and Te Komititanga square, and is opposite Waitematā railway station.

The centre replaced a precinct that was known as Downtown Shopping Centre, formerly Westfield Downtown. In late 2012, it was sold by Westfield to Precinct Properties, formerly AMP NZ Office Limited (ANZO). The building closed on 28 May 2016 after 41 years, and by 23 November had been demolished. A new mall building and the PwC Tower was built on the site, with City Rail Link tunnels going through the foundations of the building.

The name "Commercial Bay" refers to the area's previous name in the 1900s. The first shop of the new development, an H&M store, was opened in August 2018. Following multiple delays, the main shopping mall of the new Commercial Bay development was completed in June 2020.

== History ==
The original mall (opened 30 April 1975) had approximately 80 stores on three floors, with the three major stores being The Warehouse, Warehouse Stationery and Postie Plus. It was one of the few Westfield Group malls that did not provide a supermarket, but was also the only proper mall in the entire CBD area. In later years it was also known for being covered almost completely by huge exterior billboards, which repeatedly drew the ire of Council officers.

In 2005, the centre had retail sales of NZ$56.9 million, and 5.8 million customer visits per year. These were mostly CBD workers, tourists and the growing inner-city population. However, the centre had been called Westfield's most underperforming shopping centre in New Zealand.

Lying in the middle of a much more densely built up CBD and being considered underdeveloped with only three storeys above ground, various other plans for the site were mooted during its latter years. The centre was valued at NZ$79.1 million (2009 data).

In 2008, Westfield received approval via non-notified resource consent for a 41-storey office skyscraper (including a 2 level retail podium) on the site. The permission came under fire, as it was granted without protection requirements for a future rail tunnel from Britomart Transport Centre, which would have to pass under the building. However, in October 2008, ONTRACK noted that it had reached an agreement in principle with the owners of Westfield Downtown to allow the tunnel route to be threaded through the future foundations.

The Downtown Shopping Centre closed on 28 May 2016 after 41 years and by 23 November had been demolished. It was replaced with a 41-storey skyscraper and shopping mall building, which opened in stages between 2018 and 2020. Auckland Council and proprietors Precinct Properties struck a deal to include tunnels for the City Rail Link directly underneath the premises.

On 20 July 2023 a mass shooting occurred at a construction site near the building, resulting in the death of 3 people, including the killer.

== Gallery ==
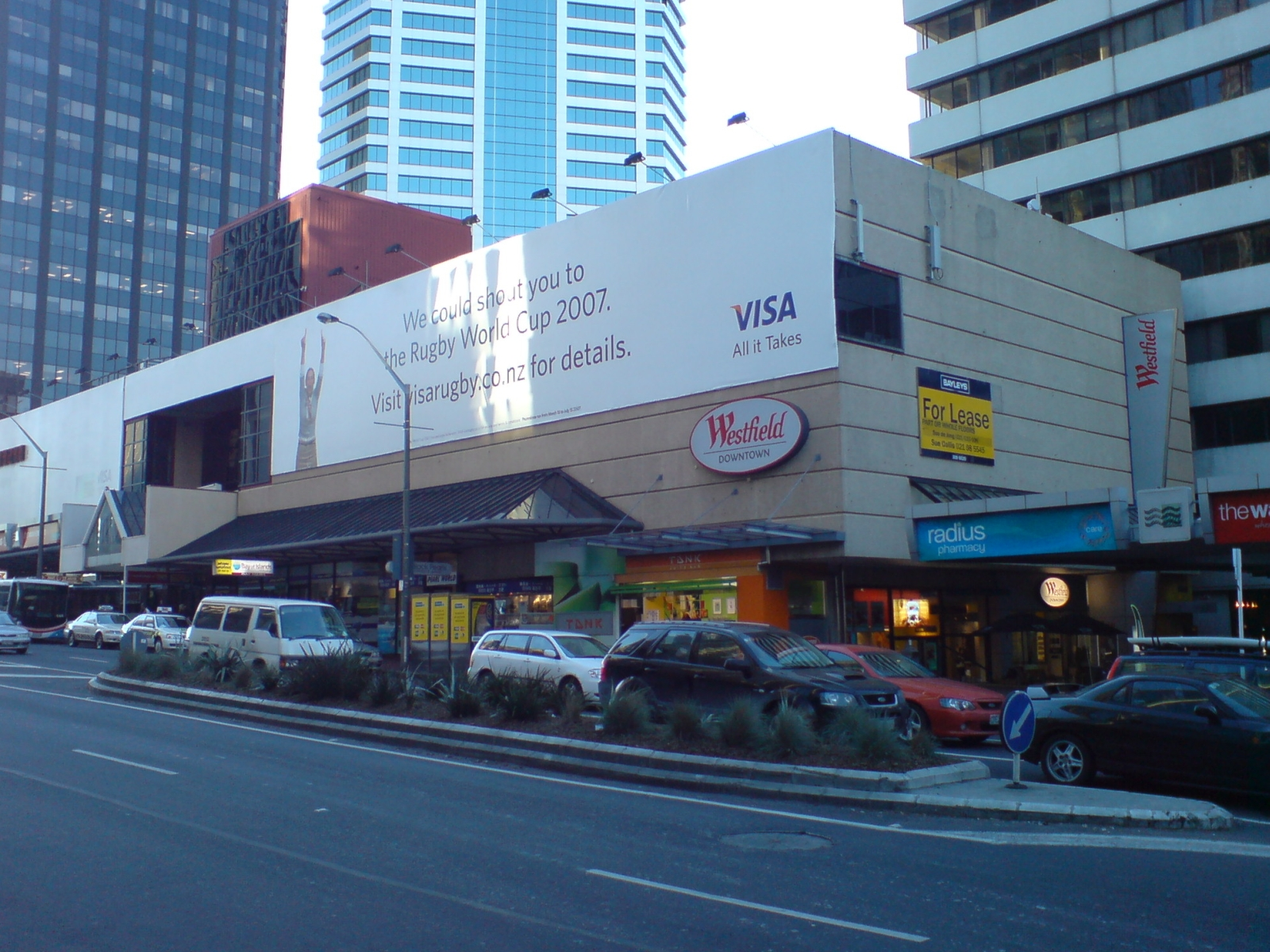
Shopping centre, as seen from the Queen Street intersection, looking north

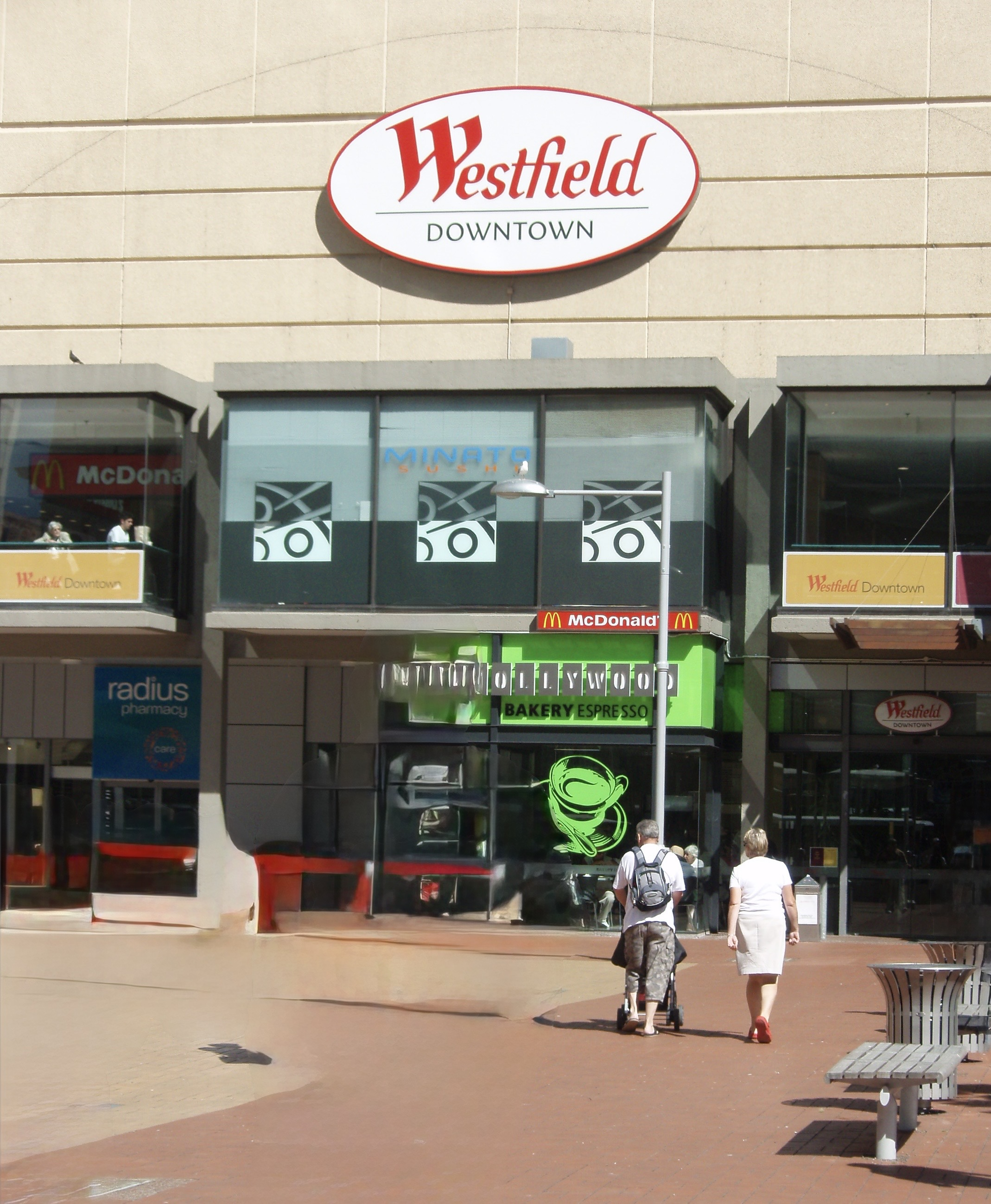
Westfield downtown entry, 2007

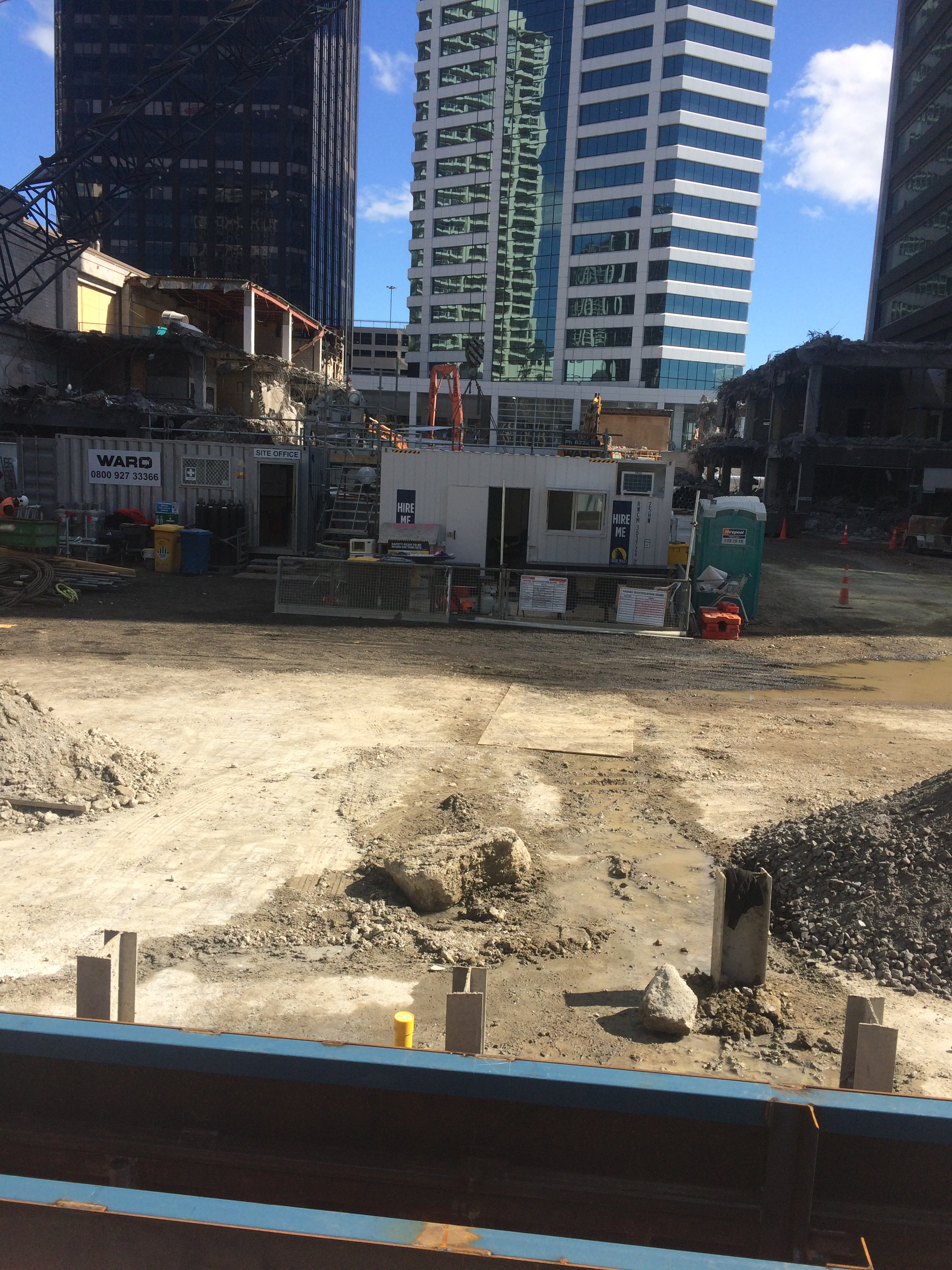
Downtown Shopping Centre after demolition

== See also ==
- List of shopping centres in New Zealand
