= Precinct Properties =

New Zealand property investment and development company

Precinct Properties New Zealand Limited
- Type: Public
- Traded as: NZX: PCT
- Industry: Property investment and development
- Founded: December 18, 1997; 28 years ago (as AMP NZ Office Trust)
- Headquarters: Auckland, New Zealand
- Area served: New Zealand
- Key people: Anne Urlwin (Chair); Scott Pritchard (CEO)
- Products: Commercial offices, retail centres, co-working spaces
- Revenue: ▲NZ$266 million (2025)
- Total assets: ▲NZ$3.699 billion (2025)
- Number of employees: 109
- Website: precinct.co.nz

Precinct Properties New Zealand Limited is a New Zealand property investment and development company listed on the New Zealand Stock Exchange (NZX: PCT). Since July 2023 it has traded as part of a stapled security structure alongside a paired entity, Precinct Properties Investments Limited.

As at 31 December 2025, Precinct's directly held property portfolio totalled approximately NZ$2.7 billion, with a further NZ$2.5 billion of committed capital-partnering assets under management, of which the company holds an interest of about NZ$2.0 billion. NZX and Precinct describe it as the largest owner, manager and developer of premium city-centre real estate in the central business districts of Auckland and Wellington.

== History ==
=== 1990s–2000s ===
The company was originally established in December 1997 as the AMP NZ Office Trust (ANZO), a listed property trust managed by AMP Capital.

=== 2010s ===
In November 2010, the trust was converted from a unit trust into a company structure under the name AMP NZ Office Limited, and was renamed Precinct Properties New Zealand Limited in September 2012. Scott Pritchard was appointed to lead the Precinct team in 2010 and has been chief executive since.

Shortly before the rename, in September 2012 the company acquired Westfield's Downtown Shopping Centre on Auckland's waterfront for NZ$90 million; the site adjoined its existing PwC Tower and would later be redeveloped as Commercial Bay.

=== 2020s ===
In 2021, the company internalised its management structure, ending its external management contract with AMP Capital for a payment of NZ$215 million, which established Precinct as a fully standalone corporate entity.

In July 2023, Precinct implemented a stapled security structure, creating a second listed entity, Precinct Properties Investments Limited (PPIL), whose shares are stapled to those of Precinct Properties New Zealand Limited (PPNZ) and can only be traded together under the single ticker PCT. Under this structure, PPNZ mainly holds long-term commercial real estate assets that qualify for Portfolio Investment Entity (PIE) tax status, while PPIL holds management income and operational businesses that do not.

Also in 2023, Auckland Council sold the Downtown Car Park waterfront site to Precinct for $122 million. Precinct plans to create a mixed-use precinct featuring retail, commercial, and residential space; the project received fast-track approval in August 2026. One of the two towers planned for the site was later postponed due to market conditions. In October 2026 the plans for the project were paused indefinitely due to market conditions.

Precinct entered the purpose-built student accommodation sector in 2024, and in May 2025 announced a $290 million capital partnership and long-term lease agreement with the University of Auckland to develop a 960-bed facility at 22 Stanley Street, scheduled to open in 2028. This followed the company's first student accommodation project at 256 Queen Street, together bringing its committed pipeline to over 1,600 beds.

In January 2026, Precinct announced plans to develop a site between Dominion Road and Valley Road in Mount Eden, with an estimated cost of $160 million and work to be started in Q4 2026. The project was put on pause in September due to market conditions.

In June 2026, Precinct agreed to sell a 50 per cent stake in PwC Tower, its Commercial Bay office tower, to Hong Kong-based investment manager PAG in a deal valuing the building at NZ$600 million, described by the company as the largest office transaction in New Zealand history. Precinct will retain a stake in the building and continue as its investment and asset manager; the sale is subject to approval from the Overseas Investment Office and was expected to settle in the first half of the 2027 financial year.

== Operations and business model ==
Precinct Properties operates primarily as a long-term corporate landlord and urban regenerator. While historically focused on commercial office leasing, the company has diversified into retail property management, co-working spaces (under the Precinct Flex/Generator brand), and hospitality. Its reported operating segments include investment properties, flexible space, hotel and hospitality, and investment management, with the majority of revenue generated from investment properties.

In the 2020s, the company expanded its investment scope by entering into joint ventures and capital-partnering arrangements to fund large-scale developments, including residential apartments and student accommodation, alongside its traditional office and retail portfolio.

== Properties ==
Precinct's portfolio is largely concentrated in the Auckland and Wellington central business districts. Notable properties include:

Property	Location	Notes
PwC Tower / Commercial Bay	Auckland	Completed 2020; Precinct agreed to sell a 50% stake to PAG in 2026
Te Iho	Wellington	Formerly Bowen House, government office near the New Zealand Parliament Buildings
Charles Fergusson Building	Wellington	Government office building
AON Centre	Wellington	Commercial office tower
Downtown Car Park site	Auckland	Mixed-use waterfront redevelopment; fast-track approval granted August 2026. Put indefinitely on hold in October 2026
256 Queen Street	Auckland	638-unit purpose-built student accommodation tower, under construction
22 Stanley Street	Auckland	960-bed student accommodation development, part of Carlaw Park Student Village

Commercial Bay was completed in 2020,with the former Downtown Shopping Centre site converted into a retail precinct anchored by the 39-level PwC Tower office building.

== See also ==
- Kiwi Property Group
- Real estate investment trust
- New Zealand Exchange
