= Point Britomart =

Former headland in Auckland, New Zealand

Coordinates: 36°50′39″S 174°46′20″E

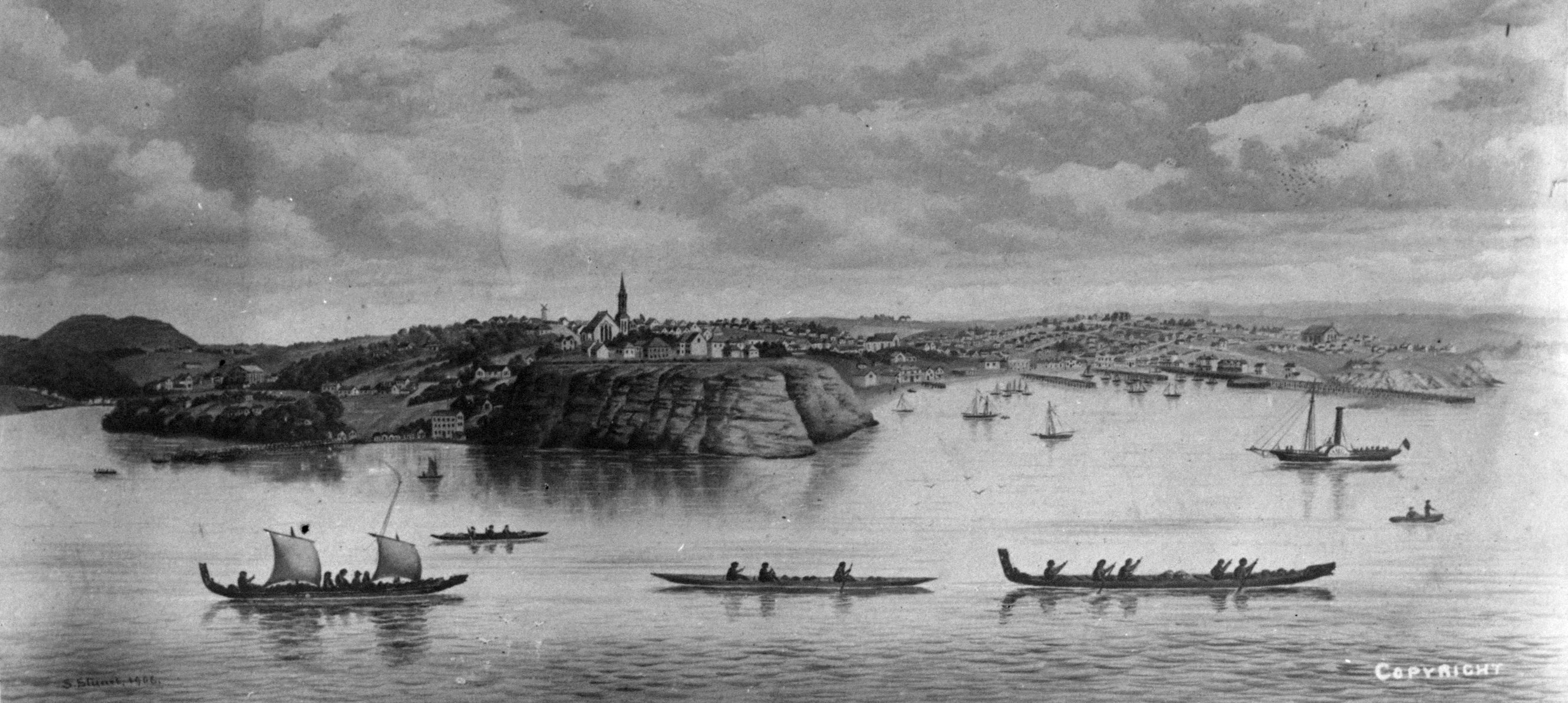
The Auckland waterfront with Māori waka and the original St Paul's building above Point Britomart, painted in 1852.

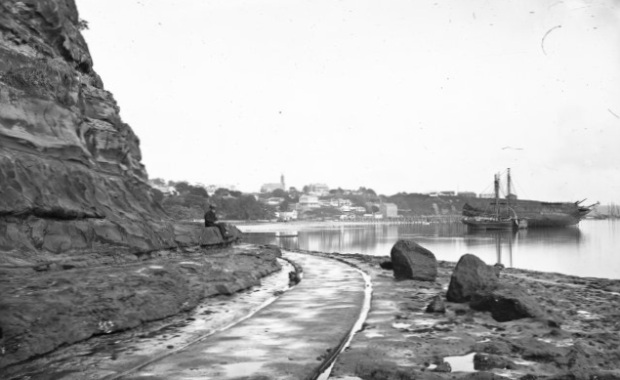
Point Britomart at the far right, seen from the east end of Official Bay, with Fort Britomart atop it.

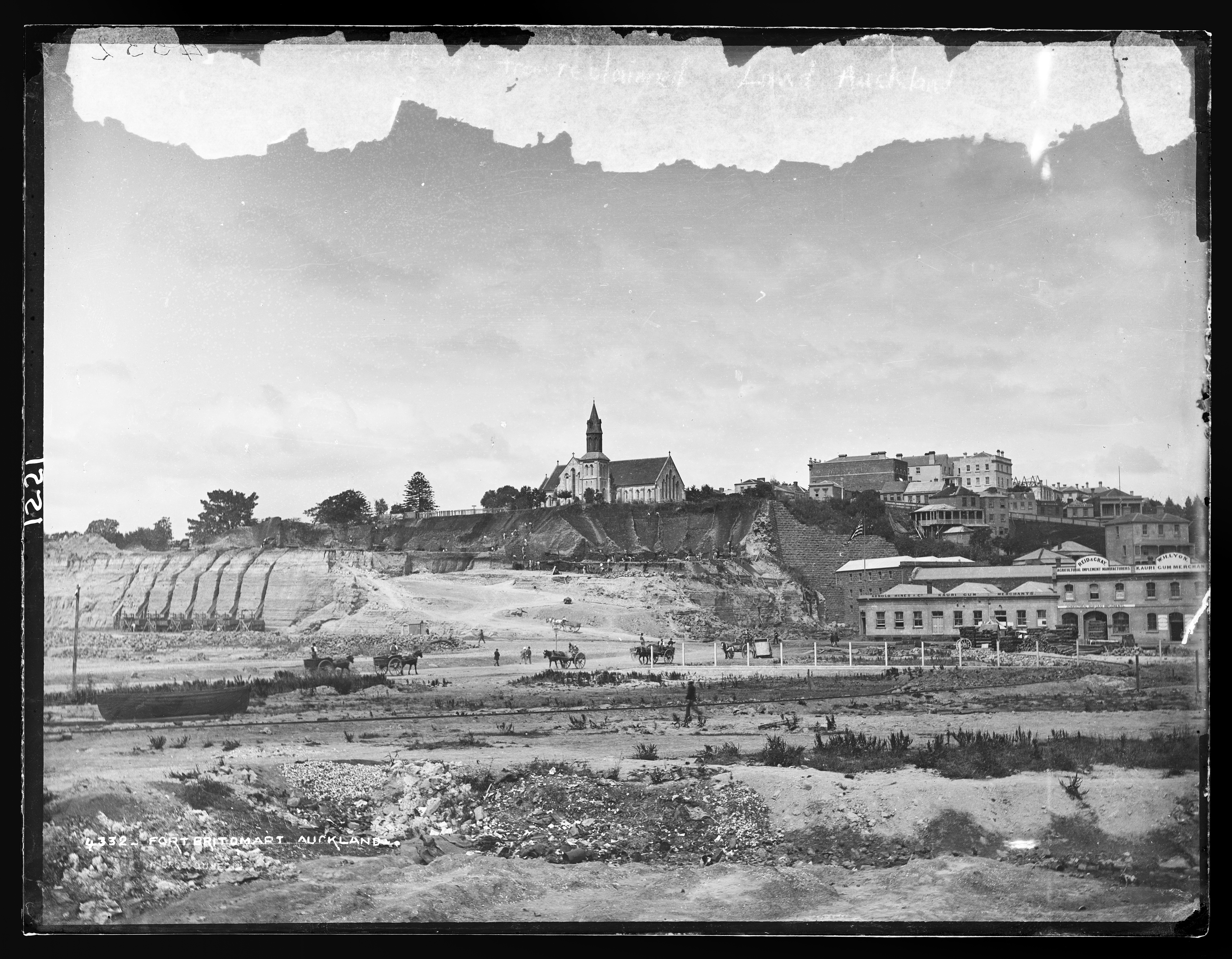
Point Britomart being quarried away. The original St Paul's building above the works was pulled down in 1885 as a result of being made structurally unsound from these works.

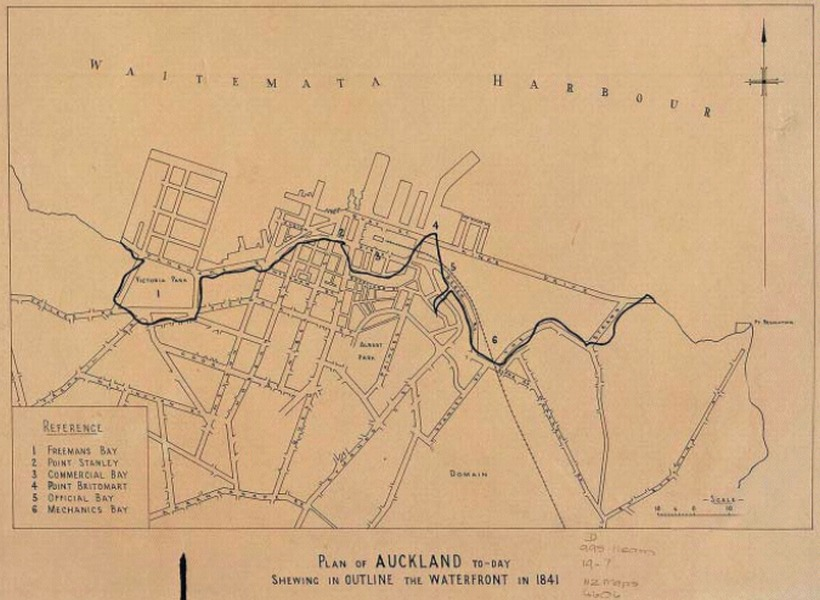
Waterfront in ca 1930, with the older coastline of 1841 also shown as a darker line. Point Britomart is the sharp headland in the centre.

Point Britomart (Māori: Te Rerenga Ora Iti) was a headland in the Waitematā Harbour, in Auckland, New Zealand. Located between Commercial Bay and Official Bay, the point was later quarried away to produce fill for land reclamation in Mechanics Bay, and almost no physical trace remains at street level in what is today an area of the Auckland CBD and the Auckland waterfront.

== History ==
Te Rerenga Ora Iti (‘the leap of the few survivors’) was the site of at least one Māori pā, and was considered an important site in Tāmaki Makaurau (Auckland isthmus), with several known battles fought over it, such as by the Ngāti Whātua iwi in the 17th and 18th centuries. The name commemorates an incident around 1680 when Ngāti Whātua drove Ngāti Huarere over the cliff to either their freedom or deaths.

After signing the Treaty of Waitangi, Ngāti Whātua paramount chief Apihai Te Kawau, gave land for British settlement on the Waitematā. It was Te Rerenga Ora Iti where the Union Jack was first raised in Auckland on 18 September 1840 by Felton Mathew, and the point soon became the site of one of the first British military fortifications in New Zealand, Fort Britomart. It was also the site of Auckland's first church, St Paul's, founded within a year of the foundation of Auckland in 1841, and one of the city's best known landmarks for 40 years. The point received its European name in 1848 from HMS Britomart, the crew of which undertook a detailed survey of the harbour of the new capital.

From 1842, Point Britomart became the first major military barracks in Auckland. This was supplemented by the construction of the larger Albert Barracks in 1846. Fort Britomart and the Albert Barracks were closed in 1870.

In the 1870s and 1880s, the point was quarried away for fill in Mechanics Bay, its spoils providing the land for a new railway station. The removal also made Official Bay more easily accessible by foot. Despite being set back from the excavations, on what is now known as Emily Place, the original St Paul's had to be demolished. The western half of the city block currently bound by Tangihua Street, Beach Road, Quay Street and Britomart Place, now occupies the site of what was once the northern tip of Point Britomart.

In 2018 Ngāti Whātua-o-Ōrākei and Ports of Auckland created Te Toka o Apihai Te Kawau, a memorial commemorating the founding of Auckland that includes a rock that marks the spot where Rerenga Ora Iti met the water, and where the city began.
