= Commercial Bay (skyscraper) =

New Zealand office tower and shopping center

PwC Tower at Commercial Bay
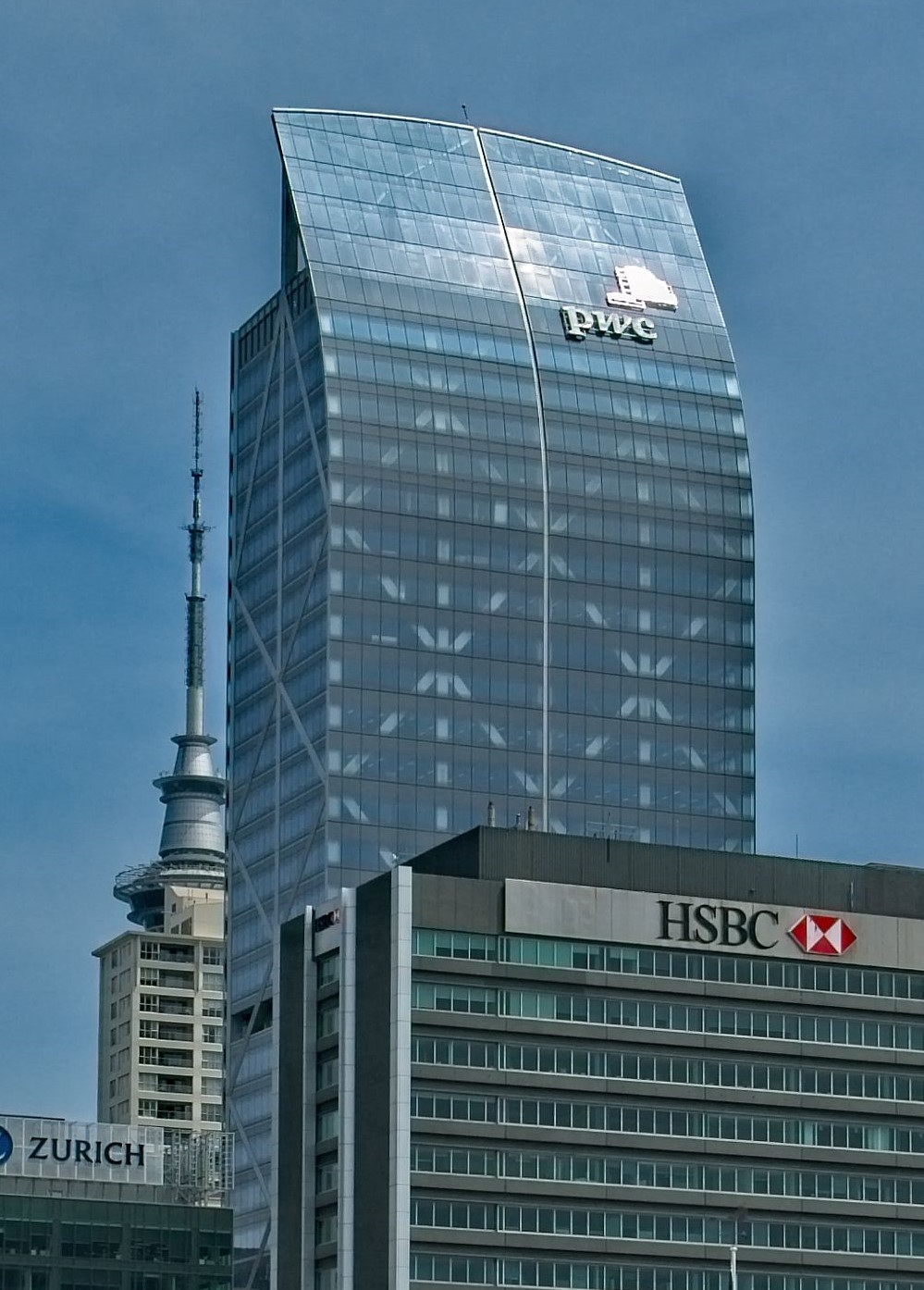

General information
- Status: Completed
- Type: Mixed-use Office Tower and Retail
- Architectural style: Modern
- Location: Auckland, New Zealand
- Coordinates: 36.8441203°S 174.7659219°E
- Groundbreaking: 2016
- Estimated completion: March 2020
- Cost: NZD $1 billion+

Height
- Height: 180.1 m (590.9 ft)

Technical details
- Floor count: 41 (36 Leasable, 2 Mechanical, 1 Meeting Suites, SkyLobby)
- Floor area: 39,000 m^{2} (419,790 sq ft) Office 18,000 m^{2} (193,750 sq ft) Retail

Design and construction
- Architect: Woods Bagot in association with Warren & Mahoney
- Developer: Precinct Properties
- Structural engineer: Holmes Consulting LP

PwC Tower at Commercial Bay is a mixed-use office tower and retail development in Auckland, New Zealand, completed and officially opened on 27 July 2020.

The development consists of a 41-floor office tower with leasable floors, three mechanical floors, one floor reserved for meeting suites/pods, a sky lobby, and the Commercial Bay Shopping Centre, which has 18,000 m^{2} (190,000 sq ft) of retail space, replacing the Downtown Shopping Centre, which was previously located on the site.

Rising 180.1 metres (591 ft), the PwC tower is the currently tallest building in New Zealand and the second tallest structure in Auckland behind the Sky Tower.

== Project timeline and construction delays ==
Construction on site began in mid-2016 with the demolition of the Downtown Shopping Centre. The retail development was originally scheduled to open in October 2018, followed by the office tower in June 2019.

Fletcher Construction, responsible for the overall construction of the development, posted massive financial losses in 2017 due to rising costs in construction. And as Fletcher Construction began to downsize its operational capabilities, the project was subsequently delayed due to numerous extension and additional cost claims to Precinct Properties, with the retail centre to be completed in March 2020 and the office tower to be completed in April 2020.

The building was officially topped out in June 2019.

The retail centre was originally scheduled to be officially opened on 28 March 2020, but just days before a nationwide coronavirus pandemic lockdown was announced and a new opening date was set for June 2020. On 11 June 2020, the development was officially opened by Prime Minister Jacinda Ardern.

=== Complexities ===
==== Accommodating the City Rail Link Tunnels under the PwC Tower ====
One of the major design complexities of the development was to accommodate the new City Rail Link tunnels running underneath the basement of the office tower to the Britomart Train Station.

The main challenge when designing the basement came from the requirement that it needed to be stepped to accommodate the CRL tunnels. There are three levels on one side of the site and one level on the other, followed by the curved tunnels running through the middle of the site.

The alignment of the tunnels had been set before the design of the office tower, and it was decided that the best way to proceed was to build the foundations of the office tower into a cavern-like structure within the development. It meant the tunnels could be completely structurally isolated from the rest of the building.

In addition, the ground conditions also varied across the site with rock encountered at four metres (13 ft) depth at one corner and up to ten metres (33 ft) at the other end, which required a range of retaining solutions to be developed around the perimeter. There were water ingress issues to be considered as the bottom of the basement is well below sea level.

Due to the location of the tunnels, some of the tower columns are unable to reach the ground.

A "transfer gymnastics" was developed for loads to transfer across the top of the tunnels so that they don't upset the alignment. The columns were also unable to be supported by the tunnels as this would have risked vibration transmission therefore by integrating the tunnel alignments with the position of the tower and the basement ramp contributed to a very sophisticated design for the base portion of the tower.

==== Floor configurations ====
All levels are configured as a side core floor plate design, where the central lift core shaft is removed from the center of the floor plates (as typical with all office buildings) to the external face of the building.

== See also ==
- List of tallest buildings in Auckland
- List of tallest structures in New Zealand
- Vero Centre
