= Commercial Bay =

Waterfront feature in Auckland, New Zealand

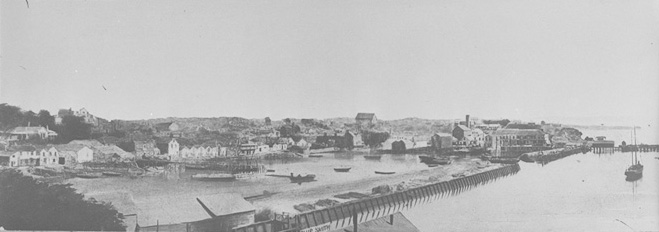
- The new seawall in 1859, before the land behind it was infilled. Today, Customs Street runs along the seawall line
- Interactive map of Commercial Bay
- Location: Auckland Region, New Zealand
- Coordinates: 36.8457°S 174.7684°E
- Ocean/sea sources: Waitematā Harbour

Commercial Bay (Māori: Onepanea) was a historic bay on the southern side of the Waitematā Harbour that defined the original extent of the Auckland waterfront in Auckland, New Zealand. Today, the name Commercial Bay refers to the heavily developed area around lower Queen Street and Viaduct Harbour.

The historic bay was framed by two substantial headlands, Smale's Point dividing it from Freemans Bay in the west and Point Britomart dividing it from Official Bay and Mechanics Bay in the east. The Waihorotiu Stream drained the valley running down to the bay. Commercial Bay was named so because from early on it had been intended as the site for the new city's business centre, in distinction from Official Bay, where government officers were first based.

Queen Street was formed down the valley, alongside the Waihorotiu, and eventually the stream was covered over. The headlands on both sides of the bay were quarried away roughly within the 1860 to 1920 period, as Auckland used their stone as fill to reclaim seashore land for the growing city and built a new waterfront with various large quays. Nowadays, the former bay and its headlands are mostly covered with high-rise buildings.

== History ==
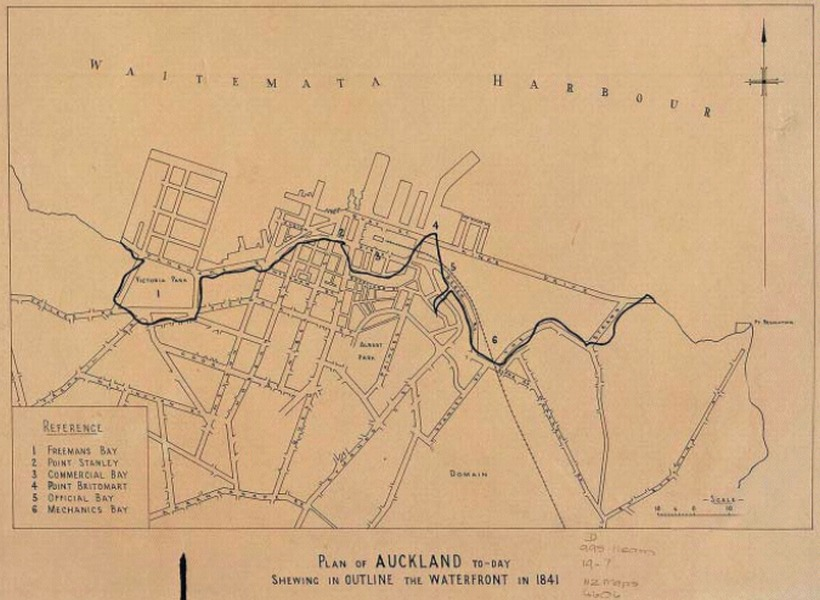
Waterfront, c. 1930, with the older coastline of 1841 also shown as a darker line. Commercial Bay in centre.

Commercial Bay was where Logan Campbell erected his tent 1840 after hearing that Auckland was to become the capital of the colony. William Swainson described it thus in 1853:

Auckland is seen to the most advantage from the harbour. The city is built on the northern side of the isthmus which divides the Waitemata from the Manukau, and is bounded on the north by the shores of the former harbour. The site has a frontage on the water of about a mile and a half, and extends inland to the distance of about a mile. At present the greater number of the houses have been built near the water, in the bays and on the headlands with which it is indented. These bays are backed by small valleys which run inland to the distance of about half a mile, terminating in narrow gullies, and are separated from each other by spurs which run into the harbour and terminate in low headlands.

Already in 1859, a new seawall had been built running from Fort Street (previously Fore Street – along the foreshore) to the newly constructed Customs Street East, and this formed the boundary for the first 9 acres (36,000 m^{2}) of infill, straightening the previously curved coastline. By this time Smale's Point was already being quarried for fill and to allow easier passage to Freemans Bay. In the 1870s and 1880s, Point Britomart followed, to provide fill for Mechanics Bay.

By 1955, around 1.6 square kilometres (0.62 square miles) of land had been filled in, and Commercial Bay had long since ceased to exist as a recognisable landscape feature.
