= Twin Coast Discovery Highway =

New Zealand scenic highway

Twin Coast Discovery Highway

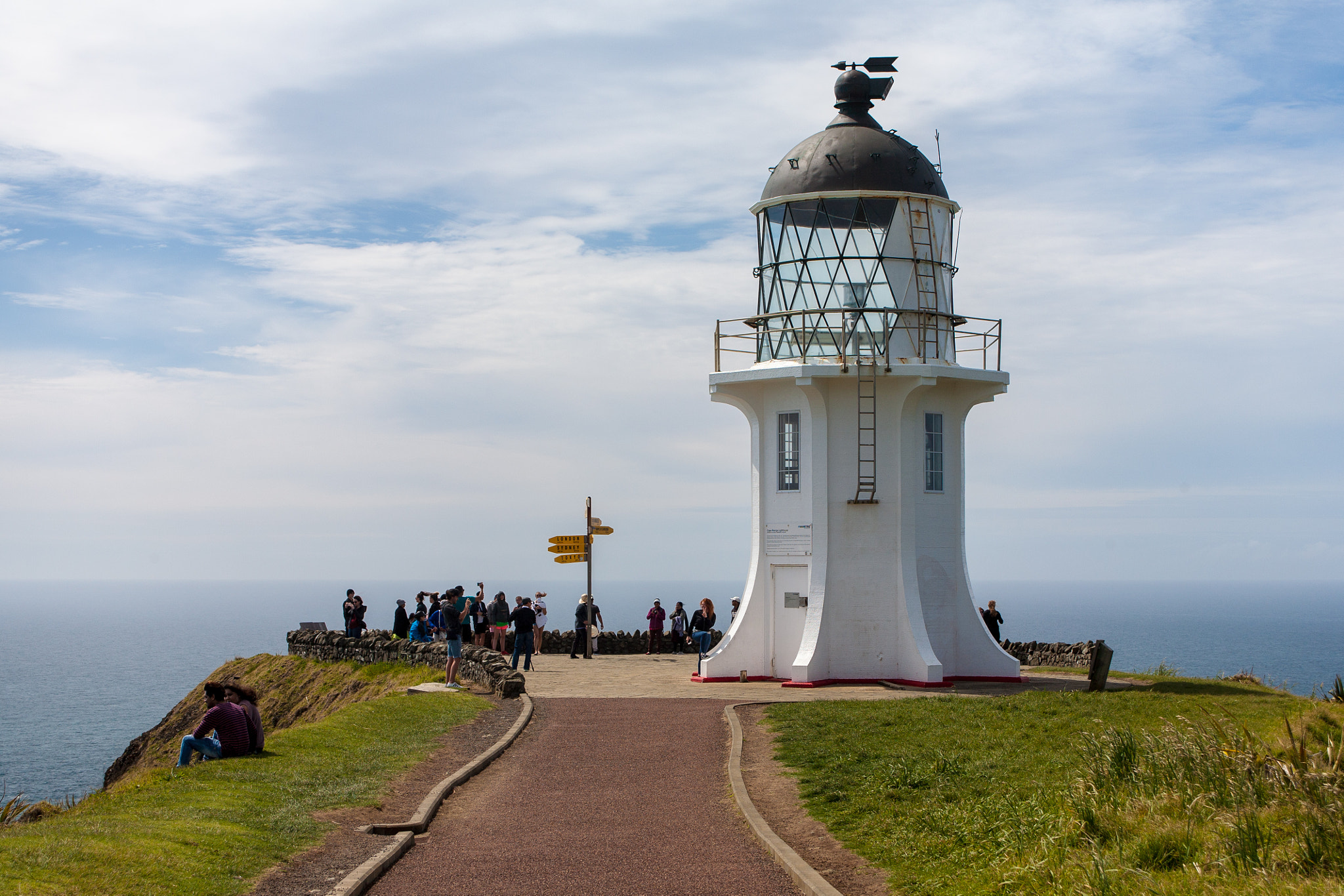
- The Cape Reinga lighthouse, at the northernmost tip of the Twin Coast Discovery Highway

Route information
- Length: 800 km (500 mi)

Location
- Country: New Zealand

Highway system
- New Zealand state highways; Motorways and expressways; List

The Twin Coast Discovery Highway is an 800-kilometre (500 mi) circular road route of Northland, a region located in New Zealand. The name "Twin Coast Discovery" is so named because the route up to and back from Cape Reinga are on different coasts.

== Major junctions ==
Region	Location	Jct	Destinations
Auckland Region	Auckland CBD		Twin Coast Discovery Starts
Auckland Region	Auckland CBD		SH 16 (Northwestern Motorway) – Port, Waitakere, Helensville
Auckland Region	Auckland CBD		SH 16 west (Northwestern Motorway) – Waitakere, Helensville
Auckland Region	Auckland CBD		SH 16 east (Northwestern Motorway) – Port
Auckland Region	Unsworth Heights		SH 18 (Upper Harbour Highway) – Greenhithe, Waitakere, Mairangi Bay
Auckland Region	Puhoi		Toll Point
Auckland Region	Wellsford		SH 16 (Port Albert Road) – Helensville, Port Albert
Northland Region	Brynderwyn		SH 12 – Dargaville
Northland Region	Dargaville		SH 14 (State Highway 14) – Whangārei
Northland Region	Dargaville		SH 12
Northland Region	Kaikohe		SH 15 (Mangakahia Road)
Northland Region	Kaikohe		SH 12 (State Highway 12)
Northland Region	Ōkaihau		SH 1
Northland Region	Awanui		SH 10 – Doubtless Bay, Bay of Islands
Northland Region	Cape Reinga		Destination
