= State Highway 17 (New Zealand) =

Road in New Zealand

State Highway 17

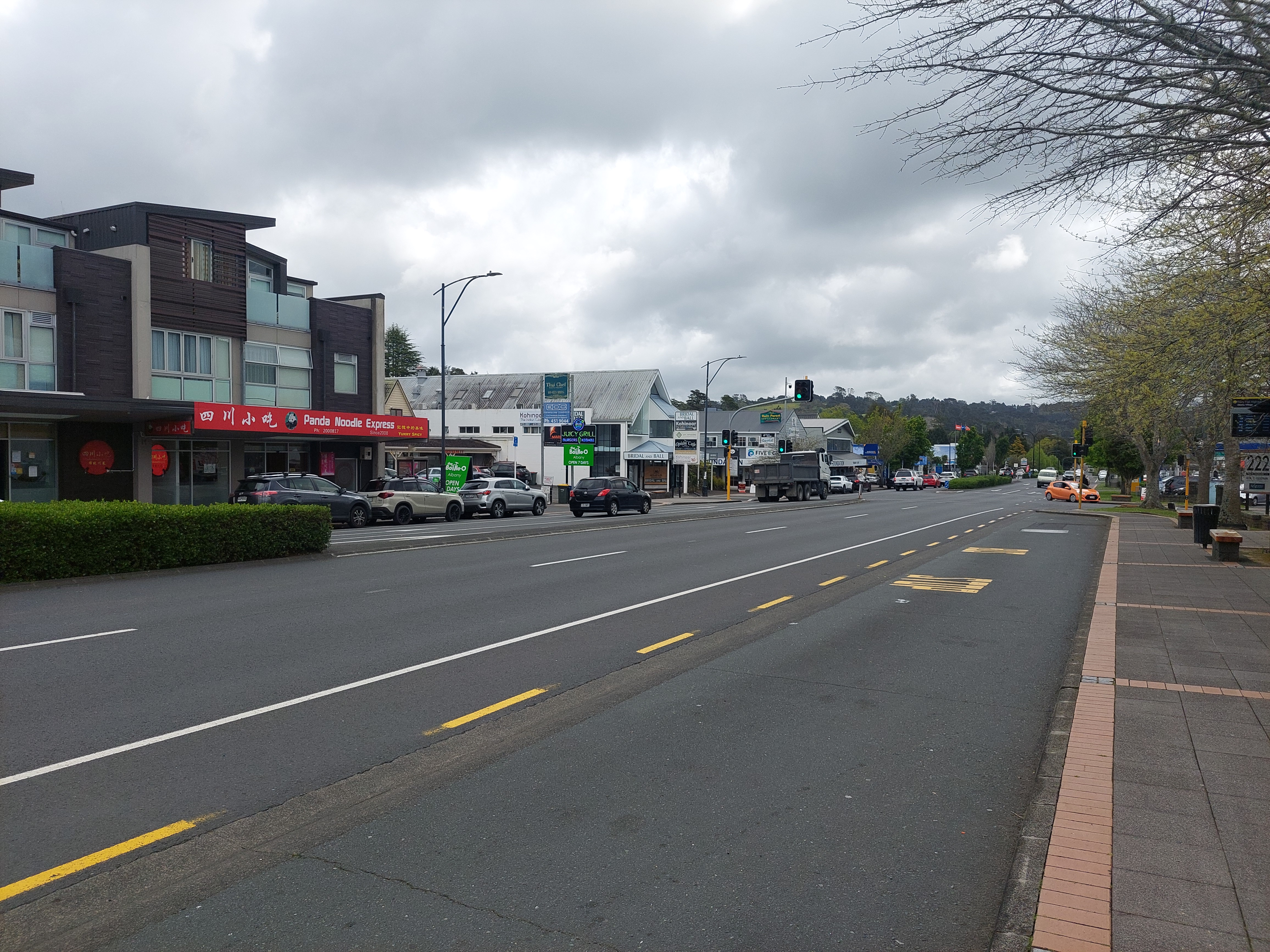
- Dairy Flat Highway in Albany, formerly State Highway 17

Route information
- Maintained by NZ Transport Agency Waka Kotahi
- Length: 32.9 km (20.4 mi)
- Existed: December 1999–October 2012

Major junctions
- North end: SH 1 at Puhoi
- South end: SH 1 at Albany

Location
- Country: New Zealand
- Primary destinations: Waiwera, Orewa, Silverdale, Whangaparāoa Peninsula

Highway system
- New Zealand state highways; Motorways and expressways; List
← SH 16	→ SH 18

State Highway 17 (SH 17) was the designation for a 32-kilometre stretch of highway in northern Auckland in the North Island of New Zealand from December 1999 to October 2012, now designated as Urban Route 31. It consists of the Hibiscus Coast Highway, Dairy Flat Highway and Albany Expressway, and links State Highway 1 at Puhoi in the north with SH 1 at Albany in the south. Its main destinations are (from north to south) the towns of Waiwera, Orewa, Red Beach, Whangaparaoa, Silverdale, Dairy Flat and the suburb of Albany. Prior to its inception as SH 17, the road was part of SH 1, and was redesignated as SH 17 in 1999 when the Northern Motorway was extended northwards and took over the designation of SH 1.

== History ==
SH 17 was part of SH 1 before the extension of the Northern Motorway in the late 1990s. Between December 1999 and January 2009, SH 17 ran from present-day Exit 412 at Greville Road north through Albany and Dairy Flat to the interchange of SH 1, SH 1A and SH 17 at Silverdale (Exit 398).

When the SH 1 Northern Gateway Toll Road opened on 25 January 2009 it replaced both SH1's old route and SH 1A, and SH 17 was extended to replace the latter two roads, although this extension was not signposted.

State Highway 17 was revoked in October 2012 by the NZ Transport Agency because there was no need to maintain SH 1 and SH 17 as close together as they were, especially as most long-distance traffic was taking the SH 1 toll road. Upon revocation, ownership of the road was transferred from the NZ Transport Agency to Auckland Council, with the road to be maintained by Auckland Transport. The route became Urban Route 31.

== Route ==
SH 17 began at the junction with SH 1 just south of Puhoi, at Exit 388. While SH 17 officially started here, it was not signposted until its original (pre-toll road) terminus at Silverdale. SH17 wound over the Johnstone Hill and down into the town of Waiwera. From here it became the Hibiscus Coast Highway and continued along the hills, coming down into Hatfields Beach and over another hill into Orewa township.

After crossing the Orewa River, SH 17 arrived at Red Beach, where there are intersections at Red Beach Road and Whangaparaoa Road for Whangaparaoa and other peninsula suburbs. Just outside Silverdale is the intersection with East Coast Road, a third route into Auckland city via Urban Route 25. Almost a kilometre after this is the interchange (Exit 398) with SH 1, the Northern Motorway and Northern Gateway Toll Road. From here SH 17 was signposted through to the city.

SH 17 continued through mostly rural countryside to Albany township, passing through Dairy Flat. Just outside Albany, the surface quality of the highway improves and Botts' dots replace painted lines on the road at the intersection with the Coatesville-Riverhead Highway. As the road enters Albany it becomes the Albany Expressway, running through the township until it meets the Albany Highway, whereupon it becomes a dual carriageway through to its terminus at Greville Road and SH 1.
