= Central Motorway Junction =

Road junction in New Zealand

- Spaghetti Junction
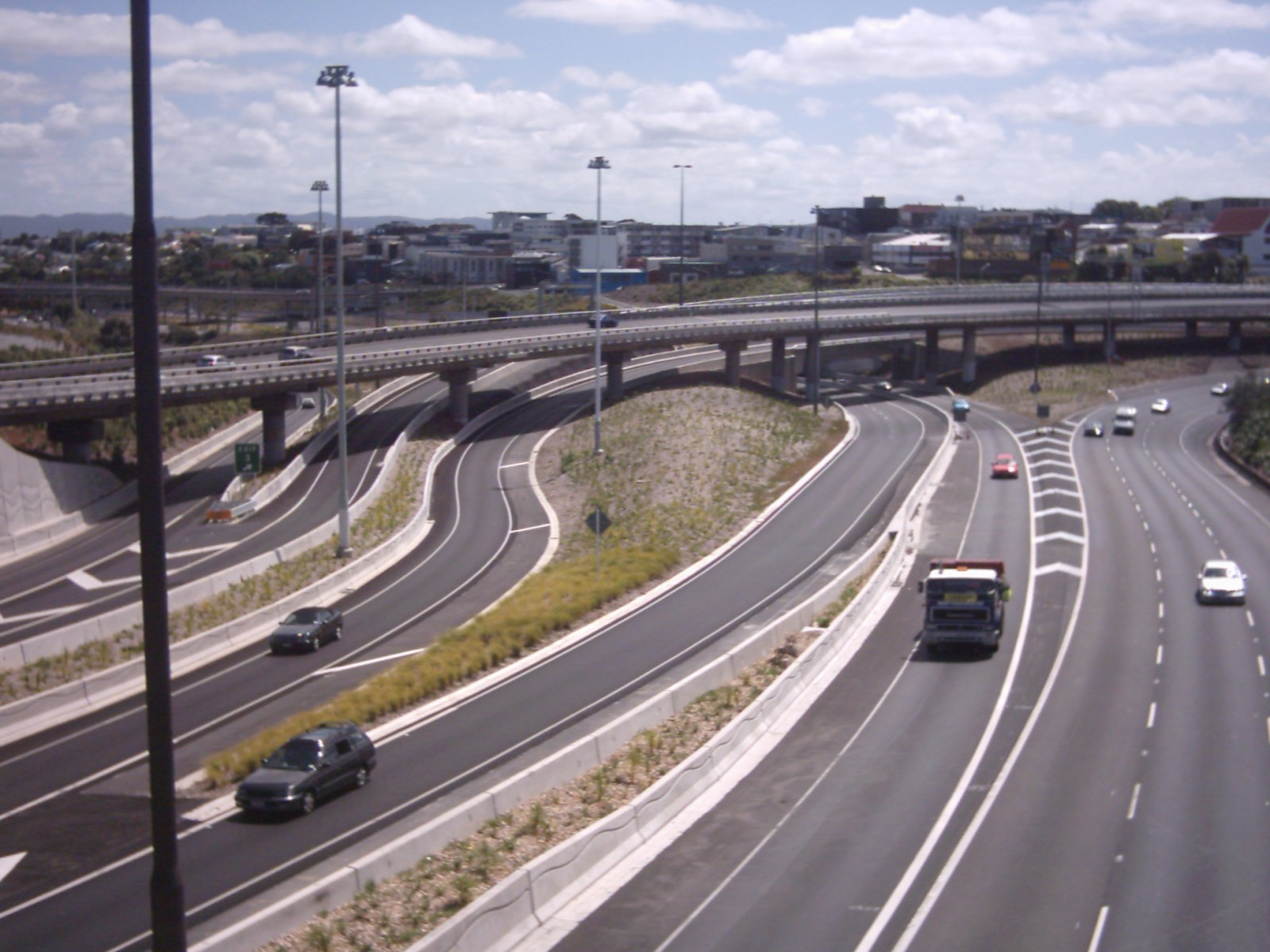
- Southern section of the Central Motorway Junction from the Upper Queen Street bridge
- Interactive map of Central Motorway Junction

Location
- Auckland CBD, Auckland, New Zealand
- Coordinates: 36.860380°S 174.760030°E
- Roads at junction: SH 1 (Northern Motorway) SH 1 (Southern Motorway) SH 16 (Northwestern Motorway)

Construction
- Type: Spaghetti
- Constructed: 1969-2006
- Opened: December 2006
- Maintained by: New Zealand Transport Agency

The Central Motorway Junction or CMJ (best known as Spaghetti Junction and rarely as Central Motorway Intersection or CMI), is the intersection of State Highways 1 and 16, just south of the central business district of Auckland. A multilevel structure (three traffic levels crossing in several locations), it has been described as a "fiendishly complicated, multi-layered puzzle of concrete, steel and asphalt". Carrying around 200,000 vehicles a day, it is one of the busiest stretches of road in New Zealand.

The junction forms the intersection between three major motorways: the Northern and Southern Motorways of State Highway 1, and the Northwestern Motorway and Grafton Gully / Port on State Highway 16, and has several off-ramps for access to the city centre. It is mainly in gullies and cuttings around the CBD, and its construction 1960–1970s removed whole neighbourhoods.

It has somewhat of a hybrid function, falling between a typical ‘X’ interchange and ring road around the city centre. All linkages are direct and there is no separate ring road. The interchange and associated structures encircle the Auckland CBD on three sides, the Auckland waterfront to the north forming the fourth 'border' of central Auckland.

== History ==
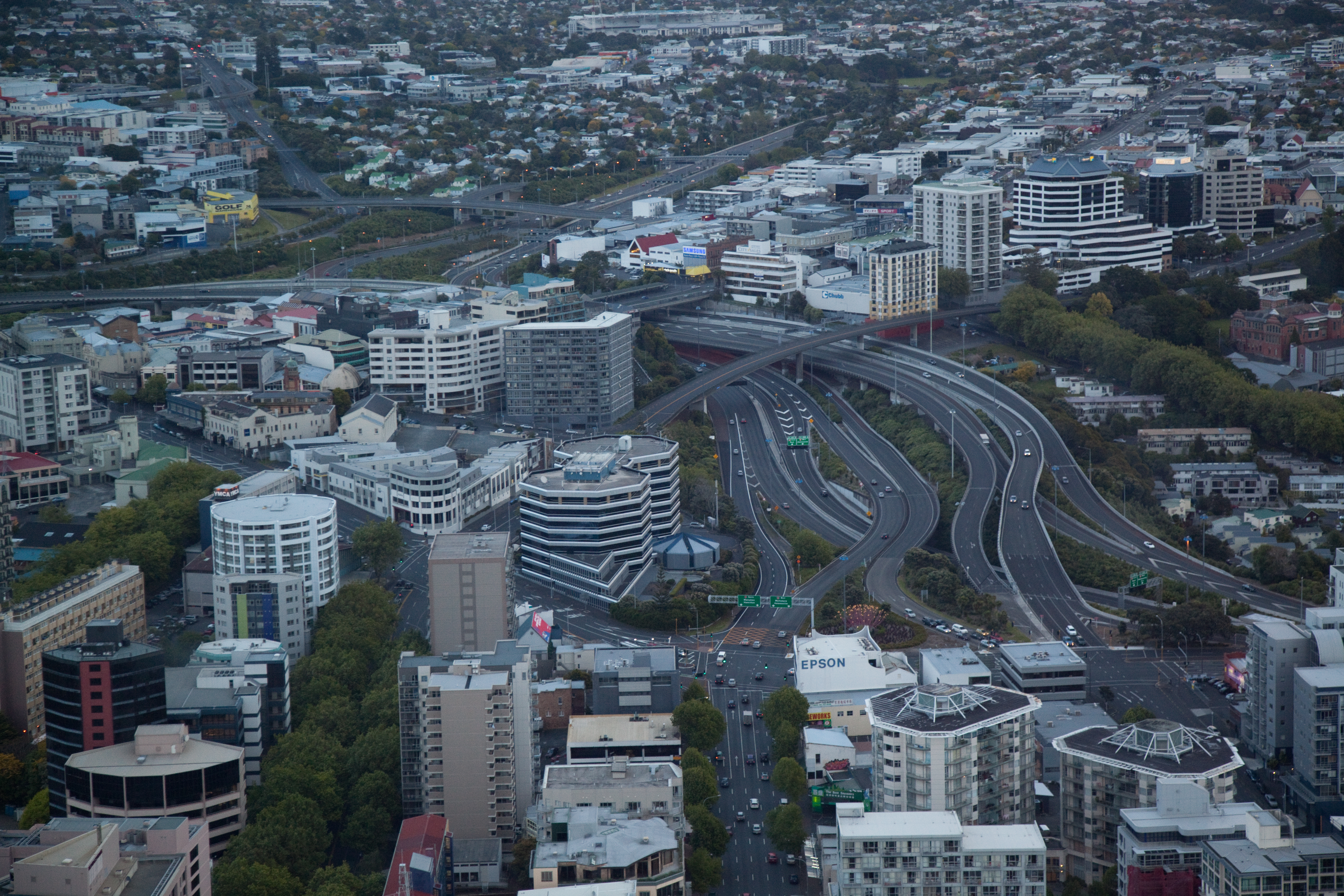
Central Motorway Junction from the Sky Tower

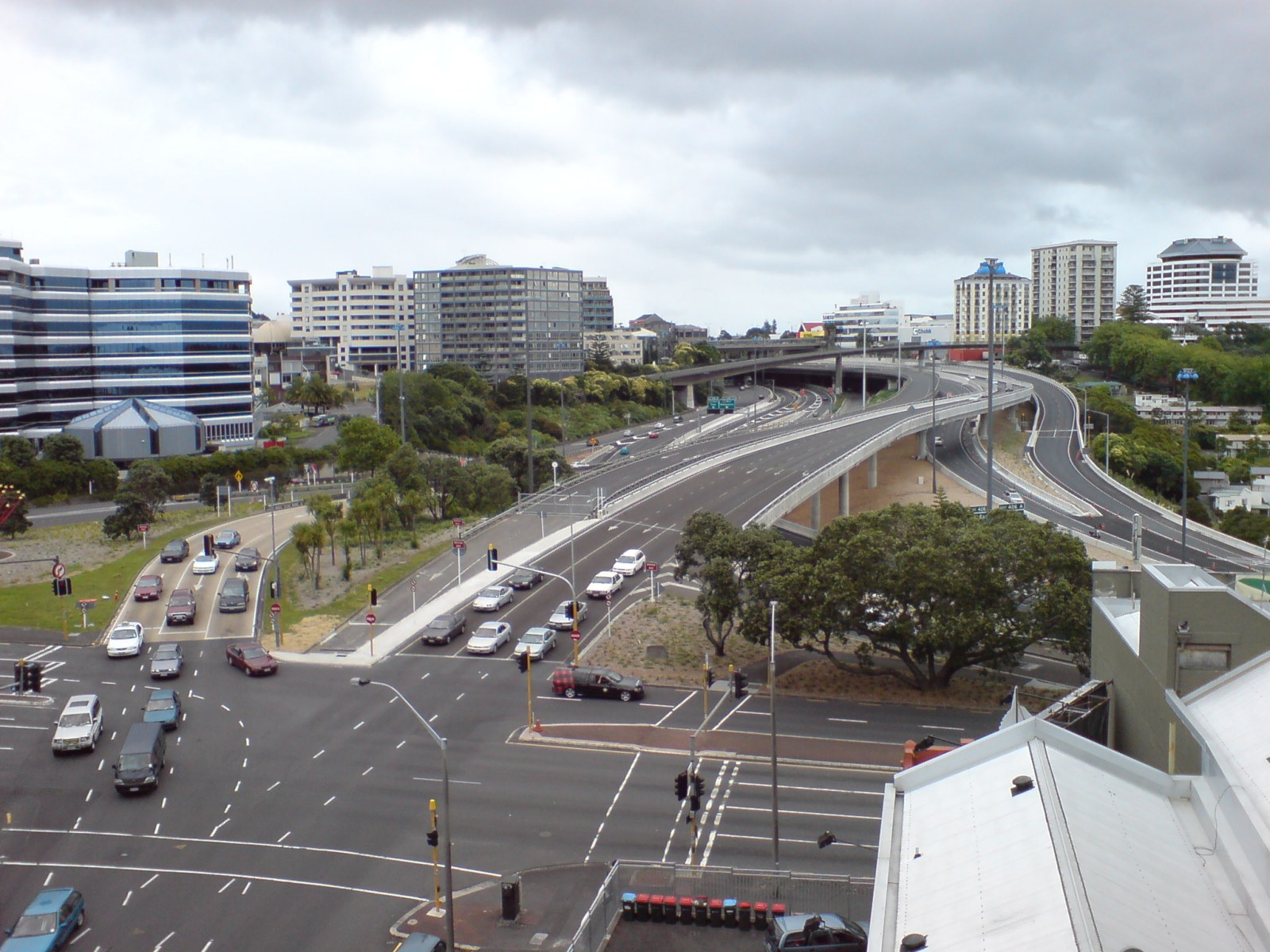
Looking south on the northern end of the CMJ.

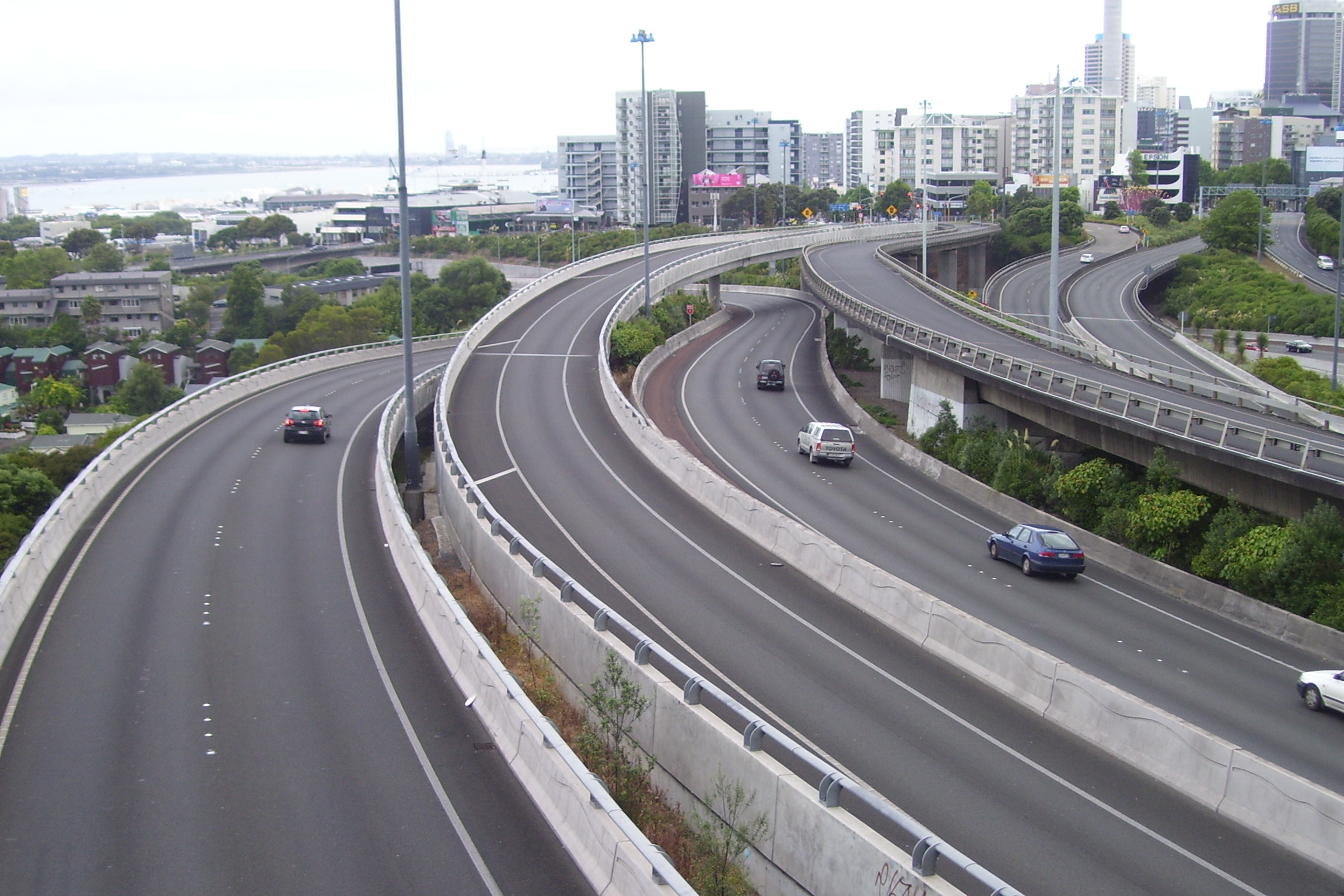
View over the northern section of the CMJ, showing ramps and links, from Hopetoun Street Bridge

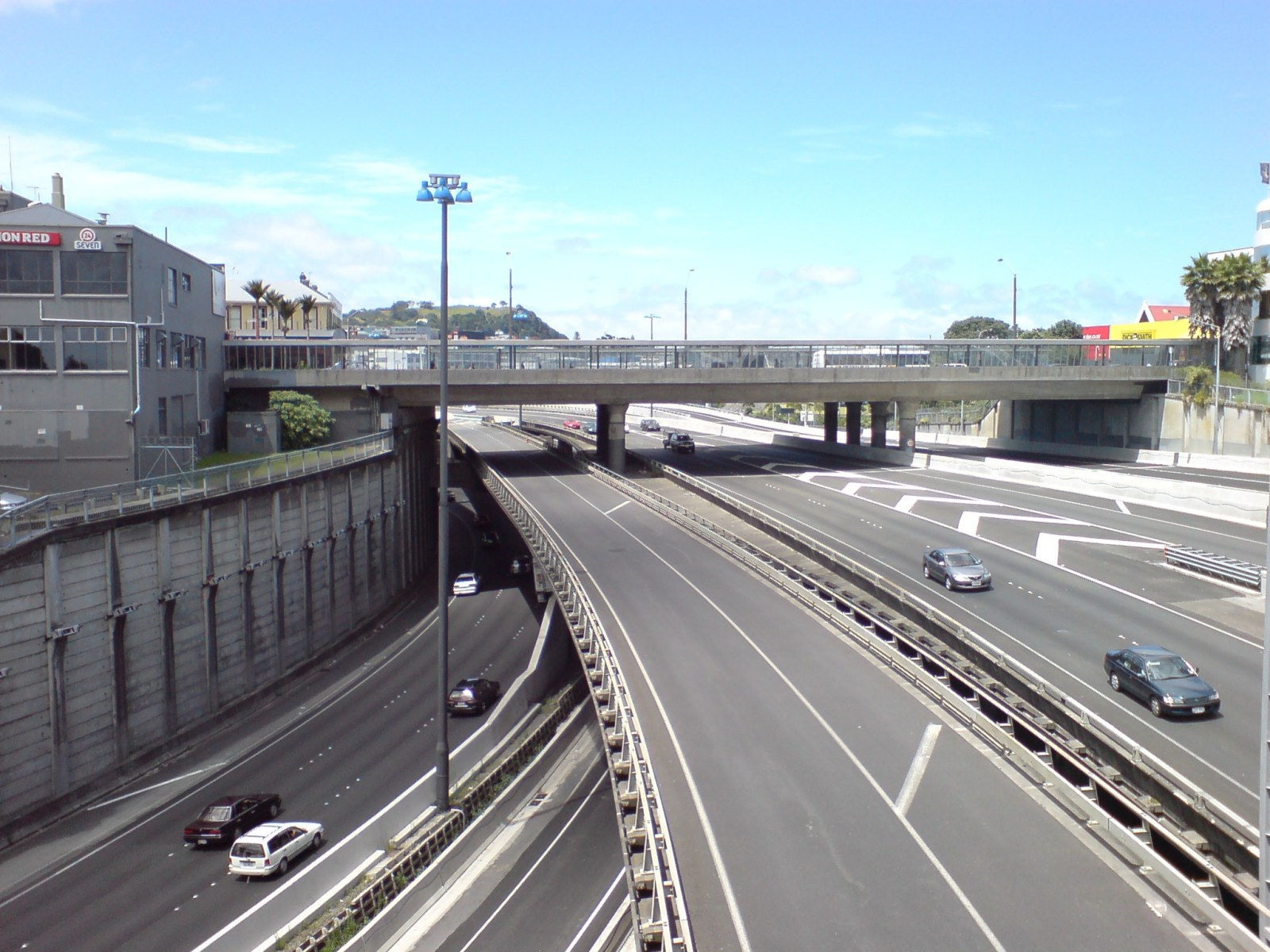
View southwards from Hopetoun Bridge, showing the three-level structure under K'Road.

Designed in the 1960s and with most of its links built in the 1970s, the CMJ was a major project in a scheme that led to the forcible acquisition and demolition of 15,000 dwellings in the inner suburbs, causing 50,000 people to move away from the area, with major negative effects on the nearby Auckland CBD, and especially the Karangahape Road shopping area, which fell into decline for decades. Two Catholic schools, St Benedict's College (secondary) and St Benedict's School (primary), were forced to close down.

The CMJ was substantially extended (or in a sense, finally completed) in the 2000s, with the final links opened to traffic in December 2006. During the duration of this NZ$208m project, the existing motorways had to be closed several hundred times during overnight, with traffic rerouted over local roads.

== Connections ==
The CMJ provides motorway-to-motorway links between the following four routes radiating from the city centre:

- Northern Motorway (SH1) to/from the North Shore via Auckland Harbour Bridge
- Southern Motorway (SH1) to/from the south
- Northwestern Motorway westbound (SH16) to/from the west
- Northwestern Motorway eastbound (SH16) to/from Ports of Auckland and eastern suburbs

The last of these links (Northwest Motorway eastbound to Northern Motorway northbound) officially opened on 19 December 2006, marking the completion of the junction. Plans have now shifted further north, with the tunnel at the Victoria Park Viaduct being the last of a set of three major motorway projects in the area.

The CMJ includes city exits from SH1 and SH16 to downtown, Grafton Gully (the first of the three large motorway projects, containing the section of the Northwestern Motorway between the Upper Queen Street bridge and The Strand in Parnell, and the Southern Motorway between Symonds Street exit and The Strand), with five other pairs of ramps giving access to the central area.

A noteworthy structural component of the CMJ is the area underneath Karangahape Rd, where 19 lanes of traffic forming nine distinct links pass through a cutting through the Karangahape ridge on a multi-level structure.

=== Alternative routes ===
The other two major motorways in Auckland, the Southwestern Motorway and the Upper Harbour Motorway, form a continuous link in the west of the city, providing an alternative to SH1 between Manukau and Albany. The goal is to provide traffic passing through Auckland, or starting or ending in the western suburbs, with an alternative high-speed route that bypasses the often congested motorways in central Auckland including the CMJ.

== Cycle path ==
The NZ Transport Agency was in November 2009 investigating a plan to extend the off-road Northwestern Cycleway through the intersection, to join it to Symonds Street and achieve better cycle linkages from the west into the Auckland CBD. In mid 2010, it became public that a preliminary alignment had been chosen, with the cycle path using the Upper Queen Street bridge to cross the motorway.

A disused offramp was repurposed in 2016 as a dedicated walking and cycling shared path, extending the Northwestern cycleway through to Nelson street. A purpose-built bridge connects Canada Street to the brightly painted and illuminated offramp now known as Lightpath/Te Ara I Whiti.

== Origin of nickname ==
The interchange's nickname comes from that of Gravelly Hill Junction in Birmingham, UK, which opened in 1972 and was given the nickname "Spaghetti Junction". Many complex interchanges around the world have also been given the same nickname.

== See also ==
- Grafton Gully
- Transport in Auckland
- Victoria Park Viaduct
