= State Highway 16 (New Zealand) =

State Highway in Auckland, New Zealand

State Highway 16
- Twin Coast Discovery Highway
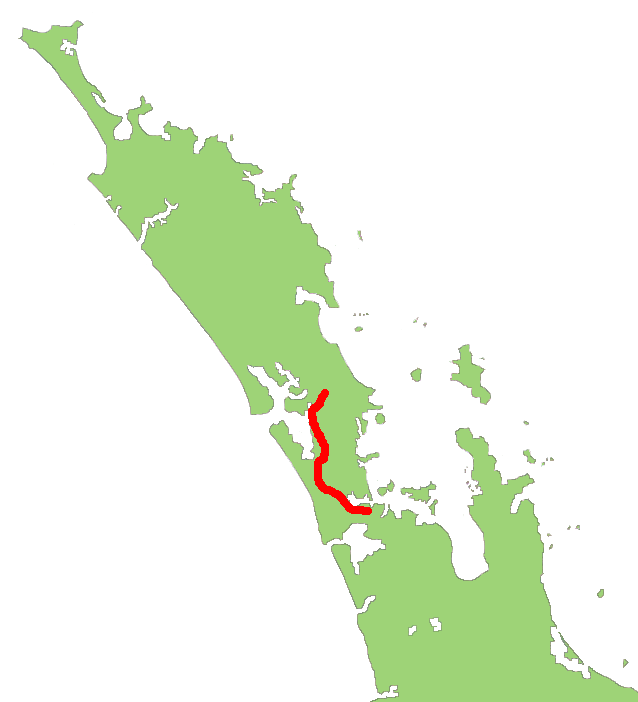

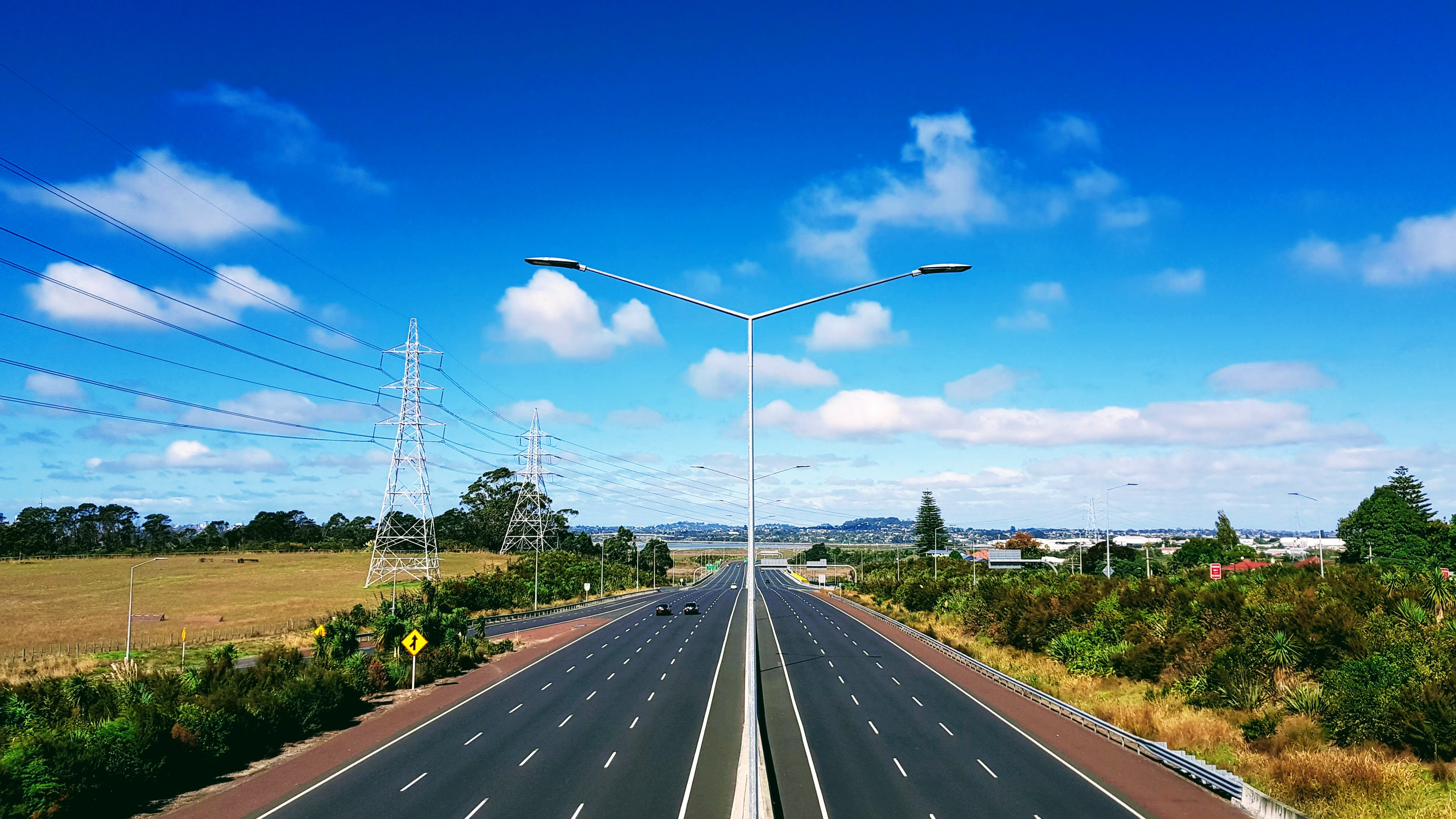
- SH16 viewed from the Te Atatu Road overbridge during New Zealand's COVID-19 lockdown

Route information
- Maintained by NZ Transport Agency Waka Kotahi
- Length: 108 km (67 mi)
- Tourist routes: Twin Coast Discovery Highway

Major junctions
- Southeast end: Port of Auckland
- SH 1 south (Auckland Southern Motorway) at Central Motorway Junction; SH 1 north (Auckland Northern Motorway) at Central Motorway Junction; SH 20 (Southwestern Motorway) at Waterview; SH 18 (Upper Harbour Motorway) at West Harbour
- Northwest end: SH 1 (Rodney Street) at Wellsford

Location
- Country: New Zealand
- Primary destinations: Auckland, Helensville, Wellsford

Highway system
- New Zealand state highways; Motorways and expressways; List
← SH 15	→ SH 17

State Highway 16 (SH 16) is a New Zealand state highway linking central Auckland with Wellsford, via Auckland's Northwestern Motorway, Helensville and Kaukapakapa. It provides an alternative to SH 1 for traffic travelling between Auckland and parts of Northland from Wellsford northwards.

Within the Auckland metropolitan area, SH 16 mostly runs along the Northwestern Motorway, the major exception being the first 2 km between the Port of Auckland and the Central Motorway Junction. Outside the Auckland metropolitan area, SH 16 is a single carriageway with at-grade intersections.

== History ==
State Highway 16 was the original Great North Road.

== Route ==
SH 16 begins in Central Auckland at the corner of The Strand, Tamaki Drive and Quay Street, directly opposite the Port of Auckland. It travels south via The Strand where it reaches the lights at Beach Road and Parnell Rise where it changes to Stanley Street. After one more set of lights at Alten Road, SH 16 becomes coextensive with the Auckland Northwestern Motorway. The highway travels through the Central Motorway Junction where there are exits to SH 1 both northbound and southbound. It then runs west and forms a junction with SH 20 and then continues to West Auckland over a causeway crossing Traherne Island and the Whau Estuary. SH 16 then passes through West Auckland and past the junction with SH 18 (Upper Harbour Motorway) where it can be accessed by northbound traffic. The Northwestern Motorway terminates at a roundabout with Brigham Creek Road and Fred Taylor Drive. From here SH 16 reverts to single carriage road. It passes through the communities of Kumeū, Huapai, Waimauku and Helensville, eventually reaching the west coast. From there on SH 16 skirts the Kaipara Harbour along the Kaipara Coast Highway, eventually bearing northeast to meet SH 1 at Wellsford, where it terminates.

== Major intersections ==
Refer to Northwestern Motorway for a complete list of motorway intersections
The entire route is within Auckland.

Location	km	mi	Exit	Name	Destinations	Notes
Port of Auckland	0	0.0			Quay Street/Tamaki Drive	SH 1 begins
Parnell	1	0.62			Parnell Rise; Beach Road	
Parnell	1	0.62			Nicholls Lane; Alten Road	SH 16 becomes Northwestern Motorway
Auckland CBD	2	1.2			SH 1 south (Auckland Southern Motorway)/Thermal Explorer Highway – Manukau, Hamilton	Westbound exit and eastbound entrance
Auckland CBD	3	1.9			SH 1 north (Auckland Northern Motorway)/Twin Coast Discovery Highway – North Shore, Whangārei	Westbound exit and eastbound entrance
Auckland CBD	4	2.5			SH 1 south (Auckland Southern Motorway)/Thermal Explorer Highway – Manukau, Hamilton	Eastbound exit and westbound entrance
Auckland CBD	4	2.5			SH 1 north (Auckland Northern Motorway)/Twin Coast Discovery Highway – North Shore, Whangārei	Eastbound exit and westbound entrance Twin Coast Discovery Highway concurrency begins
Waterview	8	5.0			SH 20 south (Southwestern Motorway)	Waterview Connection
Westgate	19	12			SH 18 east (Upper Harbour Motorway) – North Shore	Northbound exit and southbound entrance
Whenuapai	22	14			Fred Taylor Drive; Brigham Creek Road (and SH 18)	Northwestern Motorway ends
Kumeū	23	14			Coatesville-Riverhead Highway (Regional Route 28) – Riverhead, Albany	Former route for SH 18
Helensville	48	30			Parkhurst Road – Parakai, South Kaipara Head	
Wellsford	108	67			SH 1 north (Rodney Street)/Twin Coast Discovery Hwy North – Whangārei, Kaitaia; SH 1 south (Rodney Street)/Thermal Explorer Highway South – Warkworth, Auckland	SH 16 ends Twin Coast Discovery Highway concurrency ends
Concurrency terminus

== See also ==
- List of New Zealand state highways
