= The Strand, Auckland =

Street in Auckland, New Zealand

Coordinates: 36.850°S 174.782°E

The Strand
- Length: 1.0 km (0.62 mi)
- Location: Auckland CBD, New Zealand
- Postal code: 1010
- North end: Quay Street, Tamaki Drive
- South end: Parnell Rise

The Strand is a street in Auckland, New Zealand's most populous city. It connects the Ports of Auckland to the Auckland motorway network, and is the eastern end of State Highway 16.

== Demographics ==
The Strand statistical area, which covers the area between The Strand and the railway line to the north, and extends west to Alten Street, covers 0.17 km^{2} (0.066 sq mi) and had an estimated population of 1,600 as of June 2025, with a population density of 9,412 people per km^{2}.

Historical population
Year	Pop.	±% p.a.
2006	1,188	—
2013	1,482	+3.21%
2018	1,353	−1.80%
2023	1,341	−0.18%

The Strand had a population of 1,341 in the 2023 New Zealand census, a decrease of 12 people (−0.9%) since the 2018 census, and a decrease of 141 people (−9.5%) since the 2013 census. There were 672 males, 657 females and 15 people of other genders in 456 dwellings. 11.4% of people identified as LGBTIQ+. The median age was 28.0 years (compared with 38.1 years nationally). There were 72 people (5.4%) aged under 15 years, 678 (50.6%) aged 15 to 29, 540 (40.3%) aged 30 to 64, and 54 (4.0%) aged 65 or older.

People could identify as more than one ethnicity. The results were 45.0% European (Pākehā); 8.5% Māori; 6.9% Pasifika; 43.6% Asian; 7.4% Middle Eastern, Latin American and African New Zealanders (MELAA); and 1.6% other, which includes people giving their ethnicity as "New Zealander". English was spoken by 96.4%, Māori language by 2.9%, Samoan by 0.7%, and other languages by 44.7%. No language could be spoken by 0.4% (e.g. too young to talk). New Zealand Sign Language was known by 0.7%. The percentage of people born overseas was 60.6, compared with 28.8% nationally.

Religious affiliations were 23.5% Christian, 5.4% Hindu, 3.6% Islam, 0.2% Māori religious beliefs, 3.8% Buddhist, 0.4% New Age, 0.2% Jewish, and 2.5% other religions. People who answered that they had no religion were 55.3%, and 5.4% of people did not answer the census question.

Of those at least 15 years old, 579 (45.6%) people had a bachelor's or higher degree, 450 (35.5%) had a post-high school certificate or diploma, and 240 (18.9%) people exclusively held high school qualifications. The median income was $35,800, compared with $41,500 nationally. 123 people (9.7%) earned over $100,000 compared to 12.1% nationally. The employment status of those at least 15 was that 642 (50.6%) people were employed full-time, 213 (16.8%) were part-time, and 96 (7.6%) were unemployed.

== History ==
The Strand was one of Auckland's earliest streets, existing by 1843. It was formed to provide road access between the city and Parnell, New Zealand. It formed part of the eastern boundary of the Town of Auckland in 1848 but received poor funding for its formation: £1,200 per mile compared to £2,000 per mile for Queen Street.

Motorway access began with the Auckland Southern Motorway gaining on and offramps to Grafton Road between 1975 and 1978.

The Strand originally met Parnell Rise at what is now Shipwright Lane, but was realigned to provide a direct junction with Stanley Street with a new bridge taking the railway over it as part of the Grafton Gully motorway project in 2001–2004.

== Notable locations ==
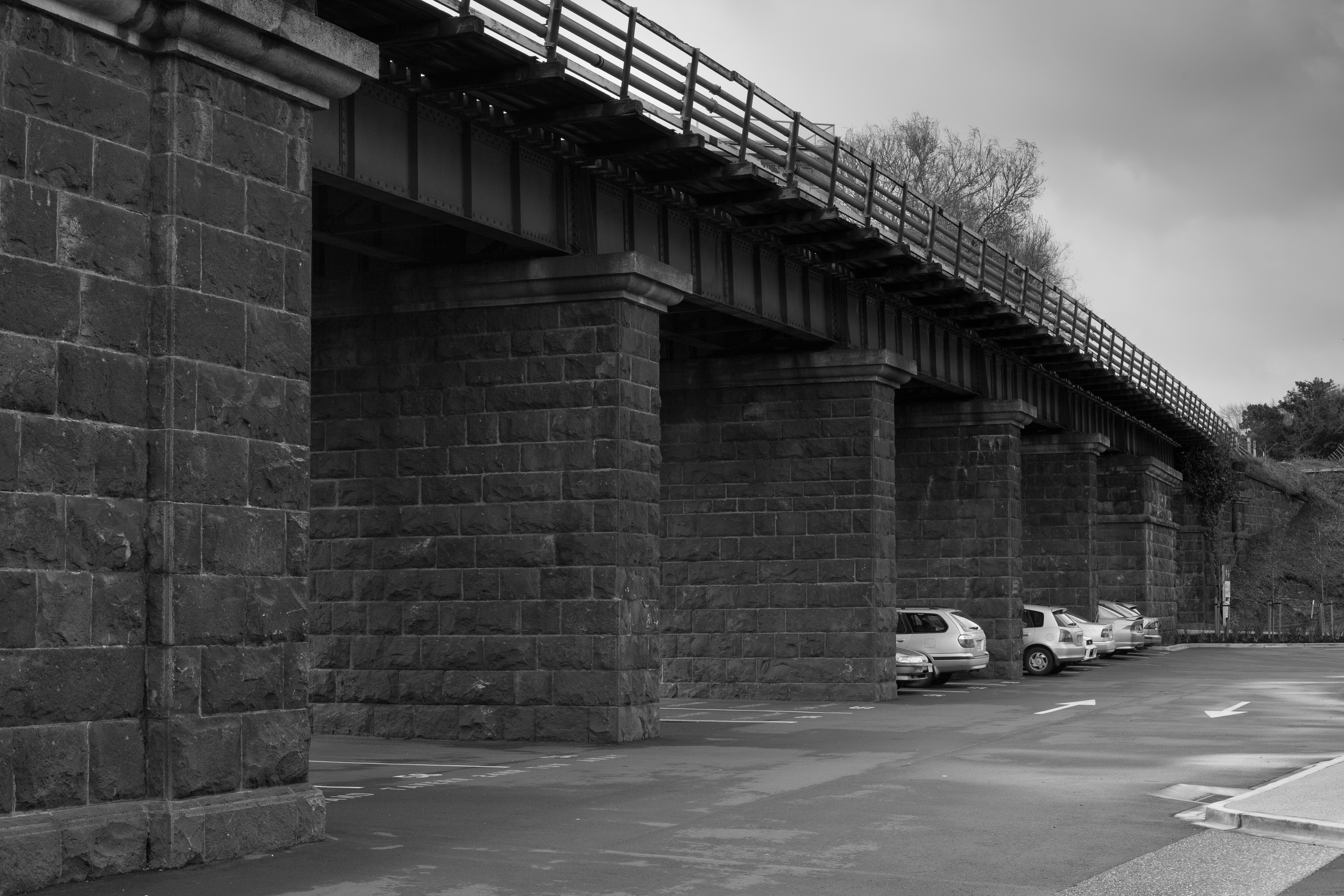
Parnell railway bridge and viaduct

- Railway bridge and viaduct, Parnell Rise, 1866, one of the oldest remaining railway bridges in the North Island.
- Swan Hotel, 31-35 Parnell Rise, before 1856, one of the earliest timber hotels in Auckland.
- The Strand Station, Beach Road, 1930, formerly the main Auckland Railway station, now a terminus for long-distance trains.
