= Auckland Northern Motorway =

Motorway in Auckland, New Zealand

Auckland Northern Motorway

Route information
- Maintained by NZ Transport Agency Waka Kotahi
- Length: 58 km (36 mi)
- Existed: 30 May 1959–present

Major junctions
- North end: SH 1 near Warkworth
- SH 18 at Constellation Drive; SH 16 (Northwestern Motorway) at Auckland City Centre
- South end: SH 1 (Southern Motorway) at Auckland City Centre

Location
- Country: New Zealand
- Primary destinations: Puhoi, Orewa, Silverdale, Albany, Takapuna, Northcote, Auckland City

Highway system
- New Zealand state highways; Motorways and expressways; List

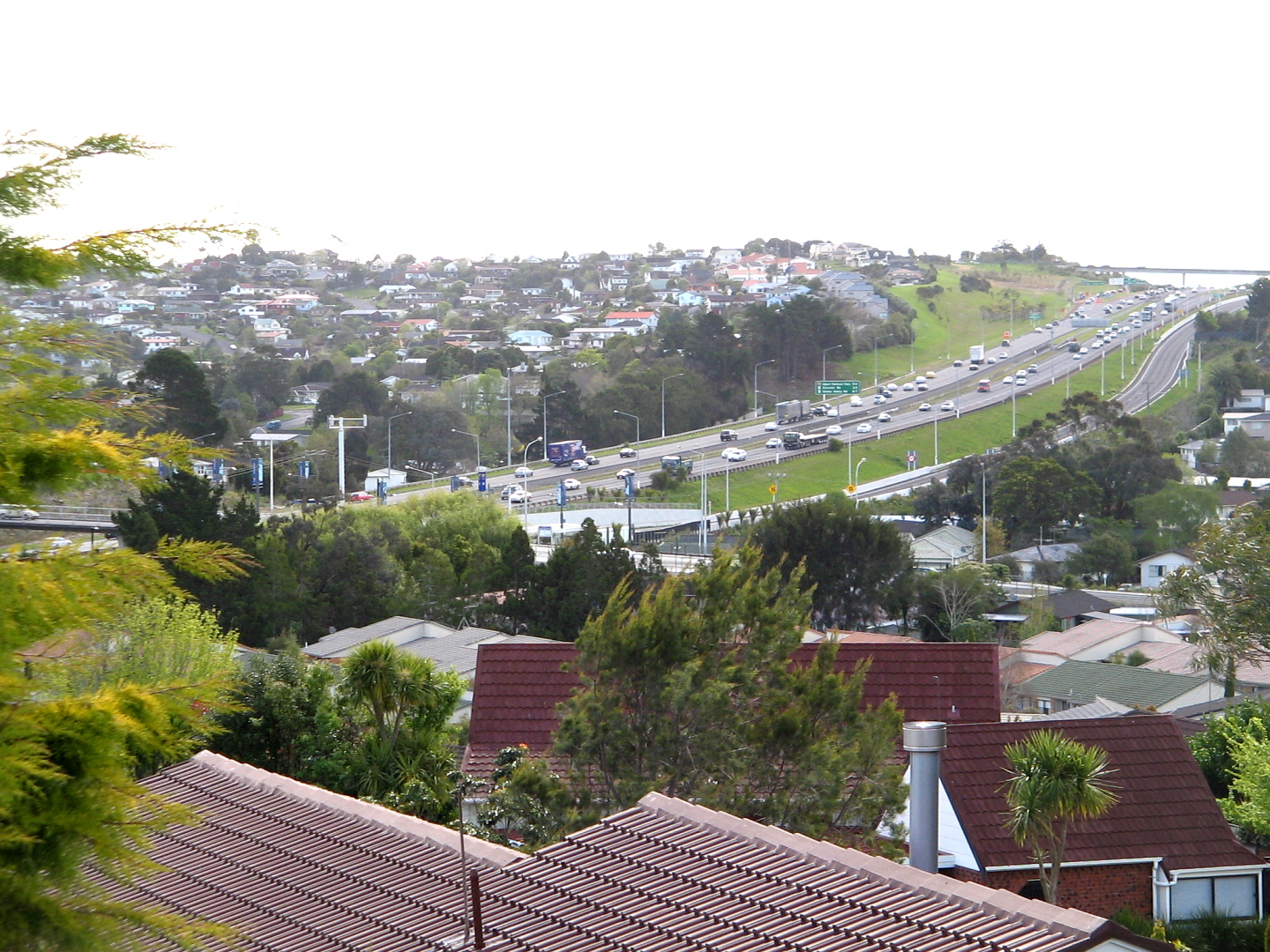
The Northern Motorway and Northern Busway from Forrest Hill, looking west.

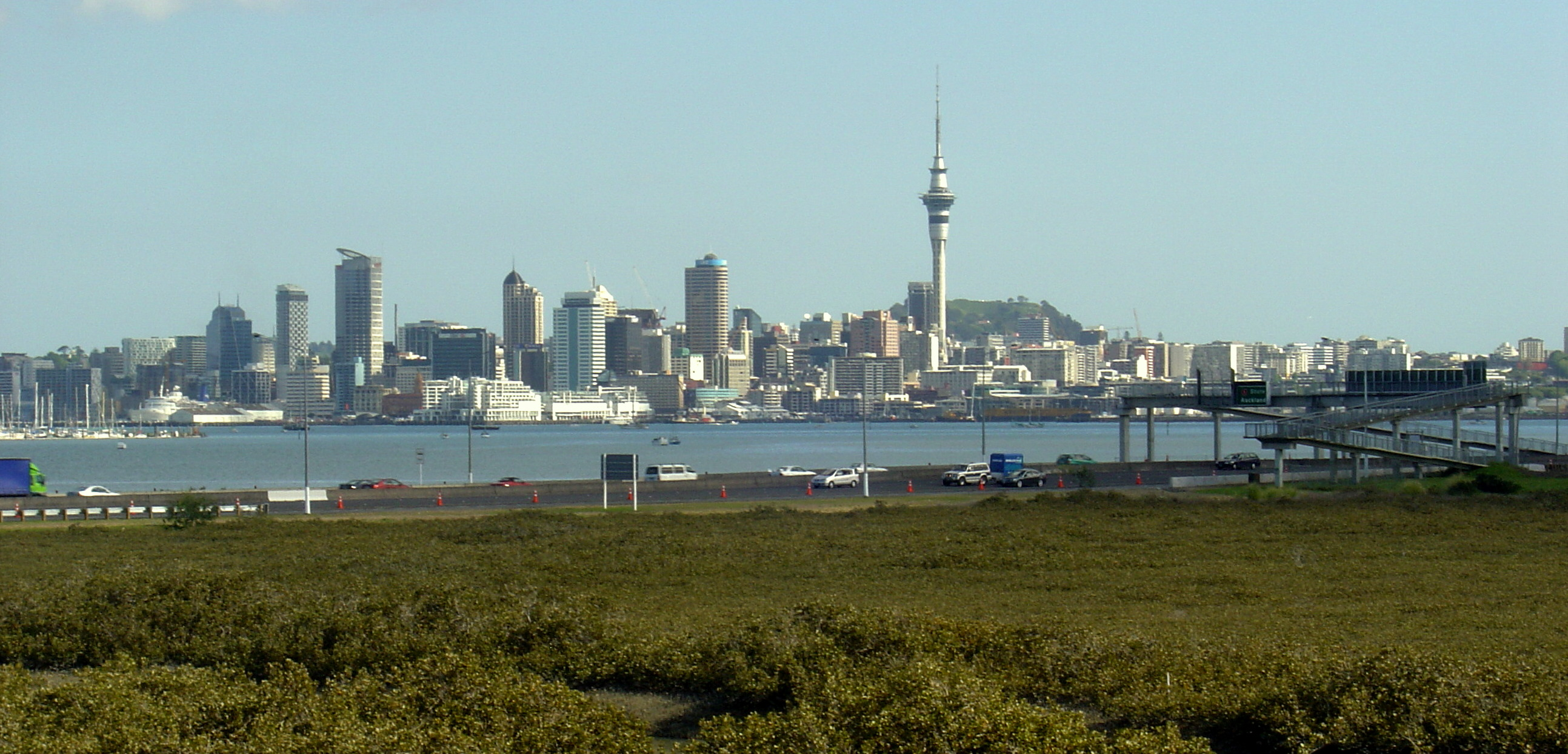
The Northern Motorway northern approach to the Auckland Harbour Bridge, looking across Waitematā Harbour to downtown Auckland.

The Auckland Northern Motorway (known locally as the Northern Motorway, and historically as the Auckland–Warkworth Motorway) in the Auckland Region of New Zealand links Central Auckland and Warkworth in the former Rodney District via the Hibiscus Coast and North Shore. It is part of State Highway 1.

It is 58 kilometres (36 mi) in length, with 17 junctions. Until the end of the 1980s, it was largely associated with the Auckland Harbour Bridge as a connection between central Auckland and the North Shore. Between the 1959 opening of the motorway and 1984, tolls were collected on the Auckland Harbour Bridge, and since 2009 tolls have been collected on the Northern Gateway Toll Road.

In 2019, 170,000 vehicles per day were crossing the Harbour Bridge section of the motorway.

== Route ==
The Northern Motorway starts near Warkworth in the former Rodney District, at the Northern end of the Puhoi-Warkworth Motorway, which opened in 2023.

It continues along the Puhoi-Warkworth motorway which replaced the old route through Warkworth until it reaches the Johnstone's Hill tunnels, the previous terminus of the motorway.

The 7 km section from Puhoi to Orewa is an automated-toll road, also known as the Northern Gateway Toll Road. It begins by travelling under Johnstone's Hill though 340-metre long twin tunnels. The electronic toll-registering gantry is at the southern end. At the first junction, west of Orewa, the motorway becomes toll free.

The next 17 km to Albany runs through a mainly rural environment. An interchange at Silverdale provides access to the Hibiscus Coast and the Whangaparāoa Peninsula, and access to the alternative toll-free route north via Urban Route 31 (formerly State Highway 17). The Orewa interchange can also be used, but requires driving through local residential areas. South of the junction at Dairy Flat is the motorway's only service centre, which serves northbound traffic, and is the toll cash-payment point for northbound traffic.

The motorway then descends steeply into the northern suburbs of the former North Shore City, the northern of Auckland's four former cities. Crawler lanes are provided for heavy vehicles between Oteha Valley Road and Greville Road. The Greville Road interchange was until 1999 the northern terminus, with the current northbound entrance and exit ramps following the old formation down to the roundabout intersection with Albany Highway.

The motorway proceeds south-east through the suburbs of the North Shore, with interchanges at Constellation Drive, Tristram Avenue, Northcote Road and Esmonde Road allowing access to the suburbs. The Constellation Drive interchange is the northern terminus of the Western Ring Route, which provides an alternative north–south motorway route around Auckland via the Upper Harbour Motorway and the Northwestern Motorway.

At Esmonde Road, the motorway turns south-west to follow the northern shore of the Waitematā Harbour to Northcote Point, where it crosses the Auckland Harbour Bridge. The bridge has a contraflow system on it which allows five lanes southbound and three northbound during morning rush hour, five lanes northbound and three southbound during evening rush hour, and four lanes each way at other times. The lanes are separated by a moveable median barrier.

Coming off the bridge, the road turns sharply to head eastwards towards the Auckland city centre. An interchange with Fanshawe Street allows access to the northern end of the city centre, and also allows lanes to be dropped ahead of the narrow four-lane Victoria Park Viaduct. The motorway then turns south-east across the Victoria Park Viaduct, and travels down the western side of the city centre, with an exit at Cook Street for the southern end of the city centre.

The motorway emerges at the top of the Central Motorway Junction ("Spaghetti Junction") and terminates at the Northwestern Motorway, becoming the Southern Motorway.

=== Northern Gateway toll ===
Tolls for the Northern Gateway Toll Road are collected electronically, using an automated toll plaza just north of the Grand Drive interchange. The automated toll plaza uses automatic number-plate recognition to identify the vehicle: the number plate is optically read and details checked against the New Zealand Transport Agency's (NZTA) database, any pre-payment made or account open for that particular vehicle. Additional sensors detect the size of the vehicle, to help prevent misreads of registration plates and to notice plate swaps between cars and trucks. If the computer system needs assistance in recognising plates or for any other reason, data is sent to the NZTA office in Palmerston North for human analysis.

Each toll cost 78 cents to collect in May 2010.

== History ==
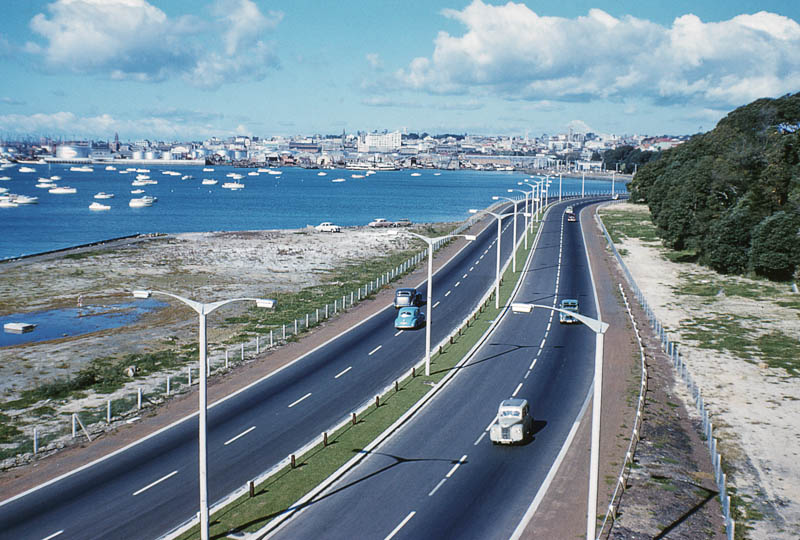
The Northern Motorway between the Auckland Harbour Bridge and the then Fanshawe Street terminus in May 1960. Photo by Denis Wilford.

The first section of the Northern Motorway opened on 30 May 1959, in conjunction with the opening of the Auckland Harbour Bridge. The motorway totalled 7.4 km, from Northcote Road to Fanshawe Street. On its opening day, 51,000 vehicles crossed the Harbour Bridge, with southbound traffic backing up for 10 km north of the toll plaza (near the present Stafford Road exit) with vehicles wishing to cross the bridge for the first time. Initially, the Auckland Harbour Bridge Authority owned and operated the motorway between Fanshawe Street and the toll plaza, while the National Roads Board (the predecessor to the New Zealand Transport Agency) operated the remainder of the motorway from the toll plaza to Northcote Road. During the motorway's construction and widening, large sections of Smiths Bush, a remnant kahikatea and taraire forest, were destroyed.

Access to the bridge was at first motorway limited, with all ramps facing towards the Harbour Bridge. Tolls for the bridge were collected manually, with cars initially paying 2/6 (two shillings and sixpence) to cross the bridge (equivalent to about $5.50 in 2017 dollars).

In 1962, the Victoria Park Viaduct opened, and the motorway was extended south from Fanshawe Street, over the viaduct, to Cook Street/Wellington Street. In 1969, the motorway was extended northwards from Northcote Road to Tristram Avenue, and the Auckland Harbour Bridge's clip-on lanes opened, widening the bridge from four lanes to eight lanes.

In 1978, the motorway was extended south to meet the Southern Motorway at Nelson Street/Hobson Street. This allowed motorway traffic a clear run from Tristram Avenue to St Stephens, on the northern side of the Bombay Hills.

In 1979, the Northern Motorway was extended northward to Sunset Road, near the present Constellation Drive interchange. The motorway ended at a set of traffic lights on the top of a hill, giving limited visibility to motorway traffic. In 1984 a two-lane expressway opened, continuing from Sunset Road to Greville Road and on towards Albany Highway. On 30 March 1984, the last tolls were collected for the Harbour Bridge, making the entire Northern Motorway free of charge from 31 March 1984.

In the 1980s, tidal flow was introduced on the Harbour Bridge to assist with peak flows on the Northern Motorway between the North Shore and central Auckland. The two central lanes were made reversible to allow a 5+3 split favouring the peak direction (southbound in the morning, northbound in the evening) during peak hours, and 4+4 off-peak. The lanes were controlled by overhead signals, which some motorists on the Motorway ignored and were killed when they collided head-on with oncoming traffic - between 1 January 1989 and 27 November 1989, five people died as a result of collisions involving the so-called "suicide lanes". In 1990, a moveable barrier was installed to separate the traffic flows.

The expressway between Sunset Road and Greville Road was upgraded and became a part of the Northern Motorway in 1994. A new interchange was then created at Upper Harbour Highway and Constellation Drive to replace the Sunset Road intersection.

The late 1990s saw the construction of the first stages of the Albany to Puhoi Realignment (ALPURT) – a 27 km extension of the Northern Motorway, bypassing Albany hill and the Hibiscus Coast Highway. The first section, ALPURT A, opened between Greville Road and Silverdale on 20 December 1999. At 13 km in length, it was the longest section of motorway to open at once in New Zealand. At the same time, ALPURT B1, a two-lane expressway between Silverdale and the back of Orewa opened.

In 2006, an upgrade to the Central Motorway Junction saw ramps open between the Northern Motorway and the Northwestern Motorway, and between the Northern Motorway and Grafton Gully. Beforehand, traffic travelling from the Northern Motorway to the Northwestern Motorway or Grafton Gully had to exit at Cook Street and travel through local city streets to connect to West Auckland or the Ports of Auckland.

ALPURT B2, the Northern Gateway Toll Road, opened on 25 January 2009 between Orewa and Puhoi. The Northern Gateway Toll Road was the first automated toll road in New Zealand, and the first under the authority of the NZ Transport Agency. At the same time, ALPURT B1 was upgraded to motorway standard to complete the Northern Motorway from central Auckland to Puhoi.

The Victoria Park Tunnel project was completed in early 2012 having been opened earlier in the year. Three northbound lanes were constructed in a cut-and-cover tunnel next to the existing four-lane viaduct. The viaduct, previously two lanes in each direction, was reconfigured to two pairs of southbound lanes; one pair accessing the Cook Street off-ramp and Port and Northwestern Motorway connections, the other connecting to the Southern Motorway. In addition to the tunnel a movable median barrier on the northbound section between the tunnel and the Harbour Bridge allows five northbound lanes to be used in peak traffic times. The southbound section was also permanently widened to five lanes.

=== Puhoi–Warkworth ===
Map of Pūhoi to Warkworth Motorway

The Puhoi–Warkworth motorway is an 18.5 km (11.5 mi) extension of the Auckland Northern Motorway from the Johnstones Hill Tunnels to just outside the town of Warkworth. This section is the first stage of a plan to extend the motorway to Wellsford. The contract for the section from Puhoi to Warkworth was awarded in November 2016 under a public-private partnership and was opened in June 2023.

=== Northern Busway ===
Although not technically part of the Northern Motorway, the Northern Busway is closely associated with the motorway. The first section of the 6.2 km bus rapid transit lanes opened in January 2008, and runs along the eastern side of the motorway between Constellation busway station (near the Constellation Drive interchange) and Akoranga busway station (near the Esmonde Road interchange). An additional 2.5 km southbound bus lane, opened in 2009, runs from Akoranga station to the Harbour Bridge approaches at the Onewa Road interchange. Dedicated ramps connect the busway with the Northern Motorway at Constellation Drive and at Albany busway station near the Oteha Valley Road interchange.

== Future ==
Route of Penlink (under construction)

=== Under construction ===
- Penlink - A link road between SH1 and the Whangaparaoa Peninsula. This road will begin from a new interchange on the Northern Motorway near Redvale. This road was originally planned as a toll road by the Rodney District Council. In 2008 the New Zealand Government announced that Penlink would be fully funded by a new regional fuel tax. In 2009 this decision was reversed. Construction began on 22 December 2022.

=== Proposed ===
- Second Harbour Crossing - A second crossing over the Waitematā Harbour. Proposals for a second crossing have undergone numerous changes, investigations and cancellations over many years.

== Interchanges ==
Territorial authority	Location	mi	km	Exit	Destinations	Notes
Auckland — Rodney Board	Puhoi				SH 1 (Puhoi–Warkworth Motorway) – Warkworth, Te Hana	Northern Gateway Toll Road begins
Auckland — Rodney Board	Puhoi			386	Puhoi Road – Puhoi	Northern Gateway Toll Road continues
Auckland — Rodney Board	Puhoi			Johnstone's Hill Tunnels (340 m)		
Auckland — Rodney/Hibiscus and Bays Boards	Orewa			394	Grand Drive – Orewa	Northern Gateway Toll Road ends
Auckland — Rodney/Hibiscus and Bays Boards	Millwater			396	Wainui Road/Millwater Parkway – Millwater	Northbound exit and southbound entrance; opened May 2015
Auckland — Rodney/Hibiscus and Bays Boards	Silverdale	398.0	247.3	398 (Note: 36°37′31″S 174°39′46″E Silverdale Interchange, Auckland Northern Motorway; exit 398)	Route 31 (Hibiscus Coast Highway) – Silverdale	Toll-free Route 31 north (formerly SH 17)
Auckland — Rodney/Hibiscus and Bays Boards	Dairy Flat	401.9	249.7	398 (Note: 36°39′34″S 174°40′03″E Dairy Flat Service Centre)	Dairy Flat Service Centre	Northbound only
Auckland — Upper Harbour Board	Albany North	409.9	254.7	410	Route 29 (Oteha Valley Road) – North Harbour Stadium, Albany	
Auckland — Upper Harbour Board	Rosedale	411.8	255.9	412 (Note: 36°44′09″S 174°43′05″E Greville Road Interchange, Auckland Northern Motorway)	Route 31 (Albany Expressway) – Albany, North Harbour Stadium, Massey University; Route 25 (Greville Road) – Rosedale, Browns Bay	
Auckland — Upper Harbour Board	Rosedale	413.4	256.9	413	SH 18 (Upper Harbour Motorway) – Greenhithe, Waitakere	Southbound exit and northbound entrance
Auckland — Upper Harbour Board	Rosedale	414.0	257.2	414 (Note: 36°45′03″S 174°43′34″E Upper Harbour Highway Interchange, Auckland Northern Motorway)	Constellation Drive – Mairangi Bay	
Auckland — Kaipatiki/Devonport-Takapuna Ward	Forrest Hill	416.8	259.0	417	Route 21 (Tristram Avenue) – Wairau Park, Wairau Valley, Glenfield, Forrest Hill	
Auckland — Kaipatiki/Devonport-Takapuna Ward	Northcote	418.8	260.2	419	Northcote Road – Northcote, North Shore Hospital, Milford	
Auckland — Kaipatiki/Devonport-Takapuna Ward	Akoranga	420.3	261.2	420	Route 26 (Esmonde Road) – Takapuna, Devonport, AUT	
Auckland — Kaipatiki Board	Northcote	422.0	262.2	421	Route 27 (Onewa Road) – Northcote, Birkenhead	Southbound entrance accessible only from east
Auckland — Kaipatiki Board	Northcote Point	422.9	262.8	422	Stafford Road	Northbound exit only
Waitematā Harbour		423.2	263.0	Auckland Harbour Bridge (Note: 36°49′50″S 174°44′26″E Auckland Harbour Bridge)		
Auckland — Waitemata Board	St Mary's Bay	425.0	264.1	423	Shelly Beach Road – Ponsonby, Herne Bay	Southbound exit and northbound entrance
Auckland — Waitemata Board	Auckland CBD	426.2	264.8	424A	Route 6 (Fanshawe Street) – City Centre (North)	Southbound exit and northbound entrance
Auckland — Waitemata Board	Auckland CBD	426.6	265.1	Victoria Park Tunnel (northbound, 440 m); Victoria Park Viaduct (southbound) (Note: 36°50′49″S 174°45′11″E Victoria Park Viaduct)		
Auckland — Waitemata Board	Auckland CBD	427.0	265.3	424B	Cook Street – City Centre (South)	Southbound exit only
Auckland — Waitemata Board	Auckland CBD				Wellington Street – City Centre (South)	Northbound entrance only
Auckland — Waitemata Board	Auckland CBD	427.2	265.4	424C	SH 16 east (Northwestern Motorway) – Ports of Auckland	Southbound exit and northbound entrance
Auckland — Waitemata Board	Auckland CBD			424D	SH 16 west (Northwestern Motorway) – Waitākere, Helensville	Southbound exit and northbound entrance
Auckland — Waitemata Board	Auckland CBD	427.0	265.3		SH 1 south (Southern Motorway) – Manukau, Hamilton	Northern Motorway ends
Incomplete access; Tolled

Coordinate list

- Distance rounds down to 427 km at the beginning of the Southern Motorway.

== See also ==
- List of motorways and expressways in New Zealand
