= Auckland urban route network =

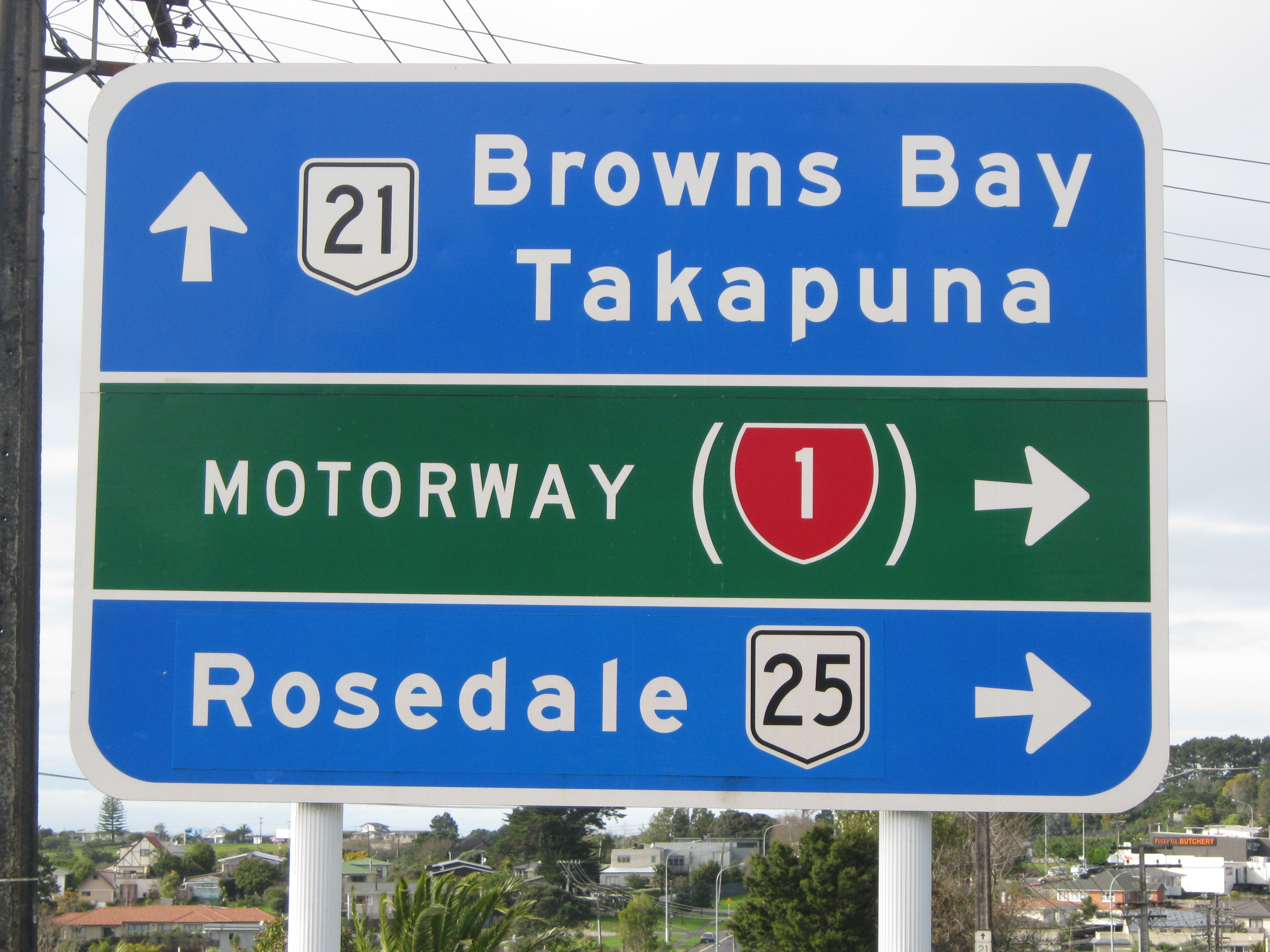
An advance direction sign showing white urban route shields.

Map showing all urban routes in Auckland

The Auckland urban route network consists of strategic and primary arterial roads across the Auckland Region of New Zealand. Urban routes are signposted with white shields with black numbers and borders. To avoid conflict with state highway numbering, there are no urban routes numbered 1, 2, 16, 18, 20, or 22.

Urban route shields are commonly found on signage at motorway interchanges and major urban intersections. The shields are accompanied by supplementary plates with arrows to direct road users along the route. Sometimes more than one urban route shield will be included on a signpost. Freestanding urban route shields are also used between intersections as reassurance that the driver is still following the route.

== Urban routes ==
This is a list of current posted urban routes in Auckland.

Route no.	Roads	Starts at	Finishes at	Suburbs served
	Mt Wellington Highway, Atkinson Avenue, Great South Road	Mt Wellington Hwy / Sylvia Park Road	SH 1 (Southern Motorway) and SH 22 at Drury interchange	Mount Wellington, Ōtāhuhu, Papatoetoe, Manukau, Manurewa, Papakura, Drury
	Upper Queen Street, Ian McKinnon Drive, Dominion Road	Karangahape Road	SH 20 (Southwestern Motorway) at Dominion Road interchange	Auckland CBD, Eden Terrace, Mount Eden, Mount Roskill
	Great South Road, Ellerslie Panmure Highway, Lagoon Drive, Pakuranga Road, Ridge Road, Picton Street, Cook Street, Minerva Terrace, Cook Street, Whitford Road, Chapel Road, Ti Rakau Drive	South Eastern Highway	Ti Rakau Drive / Harris Road	Penrose, Ellerslie, Panmure, Pakuranga, Howick, Botany
	Fanshawe Street, Sturdee Street, Lower Hobson Street, Quay Street, Tamaki Drive, Ngapipi Road, Kepa Road, Kohimarama Road, St Heliers Bay Road, Apirana Avenue, Pilkington Road, Jellicoe Road, Morrin Road, Te Horeta Road, Mt Wellington Highway, Sylvia Park Road, Great South Road	SH 1 (Northern Motorway) / Beaumont Street	Great South Road / South Eastern Highway	Auckland CBD, Ōrākei, Meadowbank, Glen Innes, Panmure, Mount Wellington, Penrose
	Tamaki Drive, St Heliers Bay Road	Ngapipi Road	St Heliers Bay Road / Apirana Ave	Mission Bay, St Heliers
	Ti Rakau Drive, Harris Road, Springs Road, East Tamaki Road	Pakuranga Road	Great South Road	Pakuranga, East Tāmaki
	St Lukes Road, Balmoral Road, Green Lane West, Green Lane East, Remuera Road, St Johns Road	SH 16 (Northwestern Motorway) at St Lukes interchange	Kohimarama Road / St Heliers Bay Road	St Lukes, Greenlane, Remuera, Meadowbank
	Carrington Road, Mt Albert Road, Mt Smart Road, Mays Road, Church Street, South Eastern Highway, Pakuranga Highway	Great North Road / Pt Chevalier Road	Pakuranga Road	Point Chevalier, Mount Albert, Royal Oak, Penrose, Sylvia Park, Pakuranga
	Waipuna Road	Mt Wellington Highway / Penrose Road	South Eastern Highway / Pakuranga Highway (Pakuanga Motorway)	Mount Wellington
	Neilson Street	Church Street	SH 20 (Southwestern Motorway) at Neilson Street interchange	Onehunga
	Great North Road, Blockhouse Bay Road	Carrington Road	Kinross Street / Donovan Street	Point Chevalier, Avondale, Blockhouse Bay
	Khyber Pass Road, Crowhurst Street, Gillies Avenue & Owens Road (southbound), Alpers Avenue (northbound), Manukau Road, Pah Road, Queenstown Road	Symonds Street / Newton Road	SH 20 (Southwestern Motorway) at Queenstown Road interchange	Newmarket, Epsom, Royal Oak
	Te Atatu Road, Edmonton Road, Alderman Drive, Henderson Valley Road, Forest Hill Road, West Coast Road	SH 16 (Northwestern Motorway) at Te Atatu Road interchange	Scenic Drive	Te Atatū, Henderson, Waiatarua
	Mangere Road, Massey Road, Kirkbride Road, McKenzie Road, Coronation Road	Great South Road	SH 20 (Southwestern Motorway) at Coronation Road interchange	Māngere East, Māngere
	Hillsborough Road, White Swan Road, Donovan Street, Kinross Street, Godley Road	Mt Albert Road	Titirangi Road	Three Kings, Hillsborough, Lynfield, Blockhouse Bay, Titirangi
	Roscommon Road, Mahia Road	SH 20 (Southwestern Motorway) at Cavendish Dr interchange / Cavendish Drive	Great South Road	Wiri, Clendon Park,Manurewa
	Lincoln Road, Great North Road, Rata Street, Ash Street, Great North Road	SH 16 (Northwestern Motorway) at Lincoln Road interchange	Blockhouse Bay Road	Henderson, New Lynn, Avondale
	Edmonton Road, Alderman Drive, Sel Peacock Drive	Great North Road	Lincoln Road	Henderson
	East Coast Road, Forrest Hill Road, Tristram Avenue	East Coast Road / Greville Road	Wairau Road	Pinehill, Sunnynook, Forrest Hill, Wairau Valley
	Fred Taylor Drive, Don Buck Road, Triangle Road	SH 16 (Northwestern Motorway) at Brigham Creek Roundabout	Lincoln Road	Westgate, Massey, Henderson
	Access Road, Waitakere Road, Scenic Drive, Titirangi Road	SH 16 in Kumeū	Great North Road / Rata Street; Great North Road	Kumeū, Taupaki, Waitākere, Titirangi, New Lynn
	East Coast Road, Greville Road	Glenvar Road	SH 1 (Northern Motorway) at Greville Road interchange / Albany Expressway	Northcross, Pinehill
	Albany Highway, Glenfield Road, Wairau Road, Taharoto Road, Fred Thomas Drive, Esmonde Road, Lake Road, Albert Road, Victoria Road	SH 18 (Upper Harbour Motorway) at Albany Highway interchange / Albany Highway	Calliope Road	Glenfield, Wairau Valley, Takapuna, Hauraki, Belmont, Devonport
	Glenfield Road, Birkenhead Avenue, Onewa Road	Wairau Road	SH 1 (Northern Motorway) at Onewa Road interchange	Glenfield, Birkenhead, Northcote
	Coatesville-Riverhead Highway	Dairy Flat Highway	SH 16 (State Highway 16) near Brigham Creek	Coatesville, Riverhead
	Oteha Valley Road, Albany Highway	East Coast Road	SH 18 (Upper Harbour Motorway) at Albany Highway interchange / Albany Highway	Albany, Rosedale
	Botany Road, Te Irirangi Drive, Cavendish Drive	Pakuranga Road / Ridge Road	SH 20 (Southwestern Motorway) at Cavendish Drive interchange / Roscommon Road	Howick, Botany, Clover Park, Manukau
	Albany Expressway, Dairy Flat Highway	Greville Road	SH 1 (Northern Motorway) at Silverdale interchange / Hibiscus Coast Highway	Albany, Dairy Flat, Silverdale
	Fred Taylor Drive, Hobsonville Road	Don Buck Road	Squadron Drive	Westgate, Hobsonville
	Great North Road, Clark Street, Wolverton Street, Tiverton Road, New Windsor Road, Maioro Street	Great North Road / Rata Street / Titirangi Road	SH 20 (Southwestern Motorway) at Maioro Street interchange	New Lynn, Avondale, New Windsor

== Outside Auckland ==
The same shield is occasionally employed elsewhere for "Regional Route" roads. These include the route UR1 in New Plymouth, the former route K in Tauranga (now SH29), and revoked state highways like the Inland Kaikoura Road (Route 70), Inland Scenic Route 72, and Route 67, the northernmost extent of SH67 on the West Coast.

The exception to this is Hamilton which has its own urban route network, but mostly only for main collector roads.

== See also ==
- List of motorways and expressways in New Zealand
