= Auckland Southern Motorway =

Road in New Zealand

Auckland Southern Motorway

Route information
- Maintained by NZ Transport Agency Waka Kotahi
- Length: 46 km (29 mi)
- Existed: 16 July 1953–present

Major junctions
- North end: SH 1 Northern Motorway at Auckland City Centre
- SH 16 Northwestern Motorway at Auckland City Centre; SH 20 at Manukau City Centre; SH 22 at Drury
- South end: SH 1 Waikato Expressway at Bombay

Location
- Country: New Zealand
- Primary destinations: Auckland City; Port; Auckland Airport; Manukau; Papakura; Drury

Highway system
- New Zealand state highways; Motorways and expressways; List

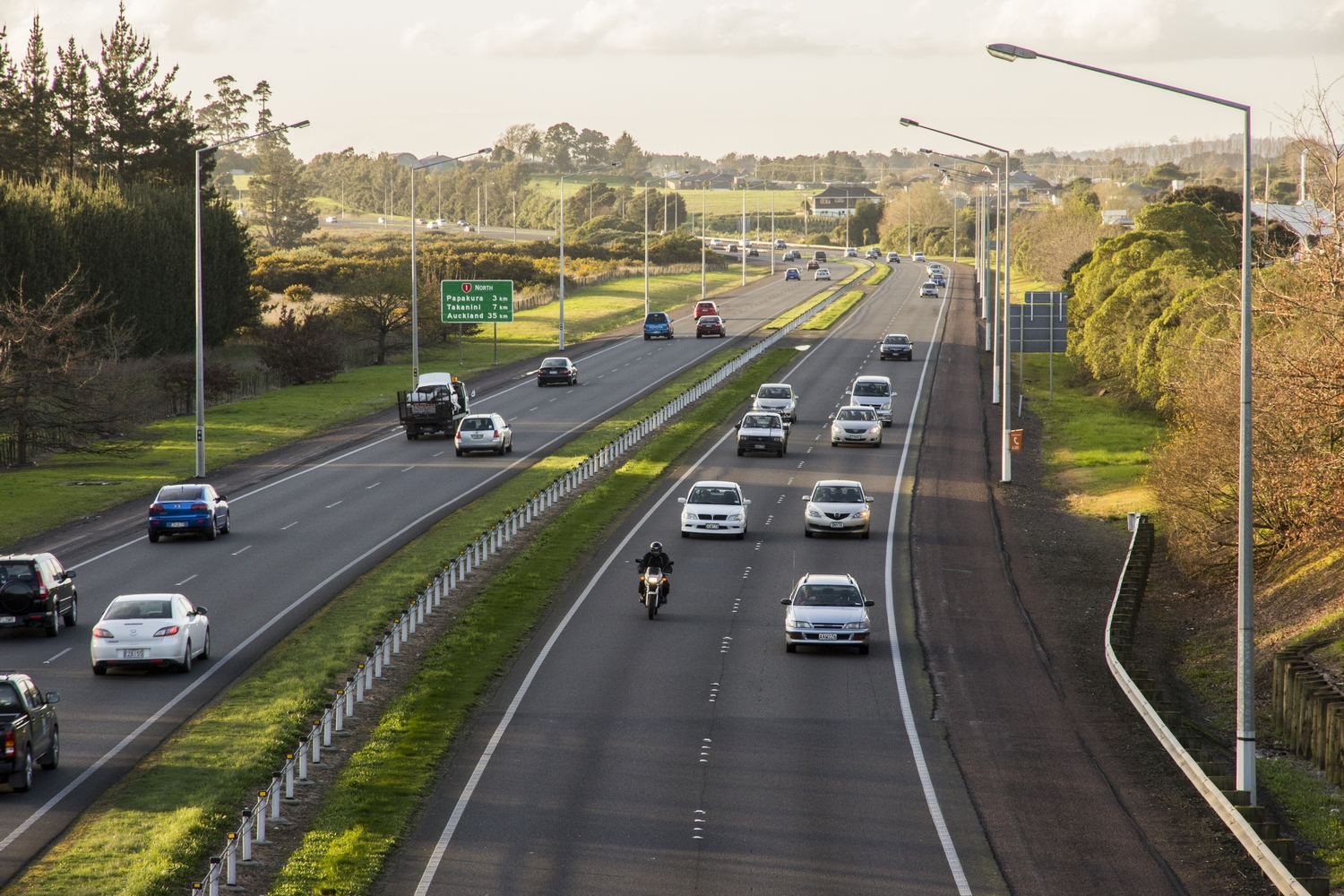
View looking north over Auckland's Southern Motorway from Bremner Road overbridge at Drury, Auckland

The Auckland Southern Motorway (also known as the Southern Motorway, and historically as the Auckland–Hamilton Motorway) is the major route south out of the Auckland Region of New Zealand. It is part of State Highway 1.

The motorway is 45 kilometres in length, with 28 junctions including termini. It runs from the Central Motorway Junction in central Auckland, through Manukau City, Papakura, and Drury, before terminating onto the Waikato Expressway at the top of the Bombay Hills.

== Route ==
The Southern Motorway starts just north of the Central Motorway Junction (Spaghetti Junction) on the west side of central Auckland. The motorway is a direct extension of the Northern Motorway, which changes to the Southern Motorway just south of exits 424C and 424D.

For the first kilometre, the road is two lanes each way due to the constraints of the Victoria Park Viaduct to the north. The motorway then delves deep into the Central Motorway Junction, turning eastward to form a southern boundary to the Auckland CBD, then turns south-eastwards as it leaves the junction. There are several exits northbound only through the junction, connecting to the city centre and the Northwest Motorway.

South of the junction is the busiest section of the motorway, and busiest section of road in New Zealand carrying an average of 200,000 vehicles per day, and to cope with this, the short section between Khyber Pass Road and Gillies Avenue is five lanes wide each way. A large volume of traffic leaves at Gillies Ave to head for Auckland International Airport.

The motorway then crosses the narrow Newmarket Viaduct, before turning to follow the North Auckland Rail Line to Ellerslie. At Ellerslie, the motorway leaves the railway line and skirts around Penrose, heading in a south-easterly direction towards Hamlins Hill where there are junctions with the South-Eastern Highway (Southbound exit and northbound entrance only) and the Mt Wellington Highway.

Immediately after the Mt Wellington Highway interchange, the motorway curves south to head towards the Tāmaki River. After crossing the Tāmaki River, the motorway forms a boundary between the suburbs of Papatoetoe to the west and Ōtara to the east. At Manukau City Centre, the motorway has a major junction with the South-Western Motorway and then bypasses Manurewa to the east. The motorway then curves towards the south-westerly direction where it crosses Great South Road at the Takanini interchange. The motorway once again curves south and bypasses Papakura to the west.

At Drury, the motorway has a junction with State Highway 22, before heading south towards the Bombay Hills. At the Bombay interchange, the motorway becomes the Waikato Expressway and continues on south towards the Waikato.

== History ==
The first section of the Southern Motorway opened on 16 July 1953, between Ellerslie-Panmure Highway (Exit 435) and Mount Wellington Highway (Exit 438). It was quickly extended southwards in 1955 to Redoubt Road to provide a higher-capacity and faster alternative to Great South Road between Ellerslie and Wiri.

In 1963, the motorway was extended at both ends, the northern terminus was moved north to Green Lane East and the southern terminus was moved south to Takanini to allow traffic to bypass Manurewa. Both ends were extended again in 1965, the northern end to St Marks Road at the southern end of the Newmarket Viaduct, the southern end to Great South Road at Runciman, just south of the current Drury interchange.

In 1966, the Newmarket Viaduct was opened, and the northern terminus was extended to Khyber Pass Road, bypassing Newmarket. An extension was also opened for northbound traffic to Symonds Street. In 1969, the motorway was extended to Wellesley Street, allow traffic in both directions to access the central city. A Symonds Street on-ramp for southbound traffic opened in 1971.

Much of the mid-1970s construction on the Southern Motorway involved building on-ramps and off-ramps in the Central Motorway Junction. Ramps to the western side of the CBD at Nelson Street and Hobson Street opened for southbound traffic in 1973 and northbound traffic in 1977. Ramps to Grafton Road, allowing access to the Port of Auckland, opened to southbound traffic in 1975 and northbound traffic in 1978.

In 1978, the southern end was extended to Great South Road at St Stephens on the northern side of the Bombay Hills and the northern end was extended to the Northern Motorway at Cook Street/Wellington Street, allowing continuous motorway travel from Tristam Avenue on the North Shore to St Stephens. In 1988, ramps opened to allow direct motorway access between the Southern Motorway and the Northwestern Motorway.

In 1993, the southern end of the motorway was extended to Mill Road, near Bombay. The extension bypassed the traffic light-controlled crossroads at St Stephens, known to be an accident blackspot and causing delays of up to two hours during holiday periods. Accompanying the extension was the building of the first part of the Waikato Expressway, which allowed traffic from the Southern Motorway to have a clear run as far as the State Highway 2 interchange on the south side of the Bombay Hills.

In 2010 the interchange between the Southwestern Motorway and Southern Motorway at Manukau became fully operational.

On 29 January 2012 the replacement Newmarket Viaduct was opened to northbound traffic. The 7-lane (4 south, 3 north) bridge replaced the existing 6-lane structure by moving it northwards in stages. The remaining ancillary parts of the project were completed in 2013.

== Abandoned project ==
- SH1-20 east–west corridor linking the southern and western motorways between East Tāmaki and Onehunga – The Eastern Transport Corridor is a route that was reserved for a new motorway to the fast-growing business and residential suburbs of east and south-east Auckland. Strong political opposition meant that development of the route did not proceed. Instead, the focus shifted to public transport improvements. AMETI (Auckland-Manukau Eastern Transport Initiative) consisted of a major upgrade of Panmure railway station and the construction of a busway between it and Botany Town Centre in Botany. The station was upgraded, and as of November 2026, stage 2 of AMETI consists of the Eastern Busway which is scheduled for completion in 2026.

== Interchanges ==
Location	km	mi	Exit	Destinations	Notes
Auckland CBD	427.4	265.6	427	Nelson Street – City Centre (West)	Northbound exit and southbound entrance Northern terminus, SH 1 continues north as Auckland Northern Motorway
Auckland CBD	427.8	265.8	428	SH 16 west (Northwestern Motorway) – Waitākere, Helensville	Northbound exit and southbound entrance
Auckland CBD	428.4	266.2	429A-B-C	Symonds Street – City Centre (South); Wellesley Street – City Centre (East); SH 16 east (Northwestern Motorway) – Port	Northbound exit and southbound entrance
Newmarket	428.9	266.5	430	Khyber Pass Road (Route 12)	Northbound exit and southbound entrance
Newmarket	429.5	266.9	431	Gillies Ave (Route 12) – Airport, Newmarket, Epsom	Southbound exit and northbound entrance
Newmarket	431.0	267.8	Newmarket Viaduct		
Remuera West	431.8	268.3	432	Market Road	Southbound and northbound exits
Greenlane	433.1	269.1	433	Green Lane East (Route 9) – Remuera, Greenlane	
Ellerslie	434.1	269.7	434	Tecoma Street – Ellerslie, Racecourse	Southbound only
Ellerslie South	435.3	270.5	435	Ellerslie-Panmure Highway (Route 5) – Ellerslie, Penrose, Panmure, Racecourse	
Mt Wellington South	437.6	271.9	437	South-Eastern Highway (Route 10) – Airport, Onehunga, Pakuranga, Howick	Southbound exit and northbound entrance
Mt Wellington South	438.4	272.4	438	Mt Wellington Highway (Route 6) – Sylvia Park, Mt Wellington, Panmure, Onehunga	
Ōtāhuhu East	441.1	274.1	441	Princes Street – Ōtāhuhu, Middlemore, Hospital	
Ōtara West	442.6	275.0	443	Highbrook Drive	
Ōtara	443.9	275.8	444	East Tamaki Road (Route 8) – Ōtara, East Tāmaki, Papatoetoe	
Manukau CBD	446.8	277.6	447	Te Irirangi Drive (Route 30)	Southbound exit and northbound entrance
Manukau CBD	448.0	278.4	448	Redoubt Road – Manukau	No northbound exit (Access available via exit 449A)
Manukau CBD	448.7	278.8	449	SH 20 (Southwestern Motorway) – Auckland Airport	Signposted as exit 449B northbound
Manukau CBD	448.7	278.8	449A	Great South Road – Manukau	Northbound exit only
Manurewa	450.8	280.1	451	Hill Road – Manurewa	Southbound exit and northbound entrance
Takanini	453.8	282.0	453	Great South Road (Route 3) – Takanini, Manurewa	
Pahurehure	457.9	284.5	458	Beach Road/Hingaia Road – Papakura, Karaka	
Papakura	459.5	285.5		Papakura Service Centre	Southbound only
Drury	461.0	286.5	461	SH 22 (Great South Road) – Drury, Pukekohe	
Ramarama	465.6	289.3	466	Ararimu Road – Ramarama	
Bombay	471.5	293.0	471	Mill Road – Bombay, Pukekohe	Southern terminus, SH 1 continues south as Waikato Expressway
1.000 mi = 1.609 km; 1.000 km = 0.621 mi: Incomplete access

== See also ==
- List of motorways and expressways in New Zealand
