= Victoria Park Viaduct =

Major motorway viaduct in Auckland, New Zealand

Coordinates: 36.846839°S 174.753136°E

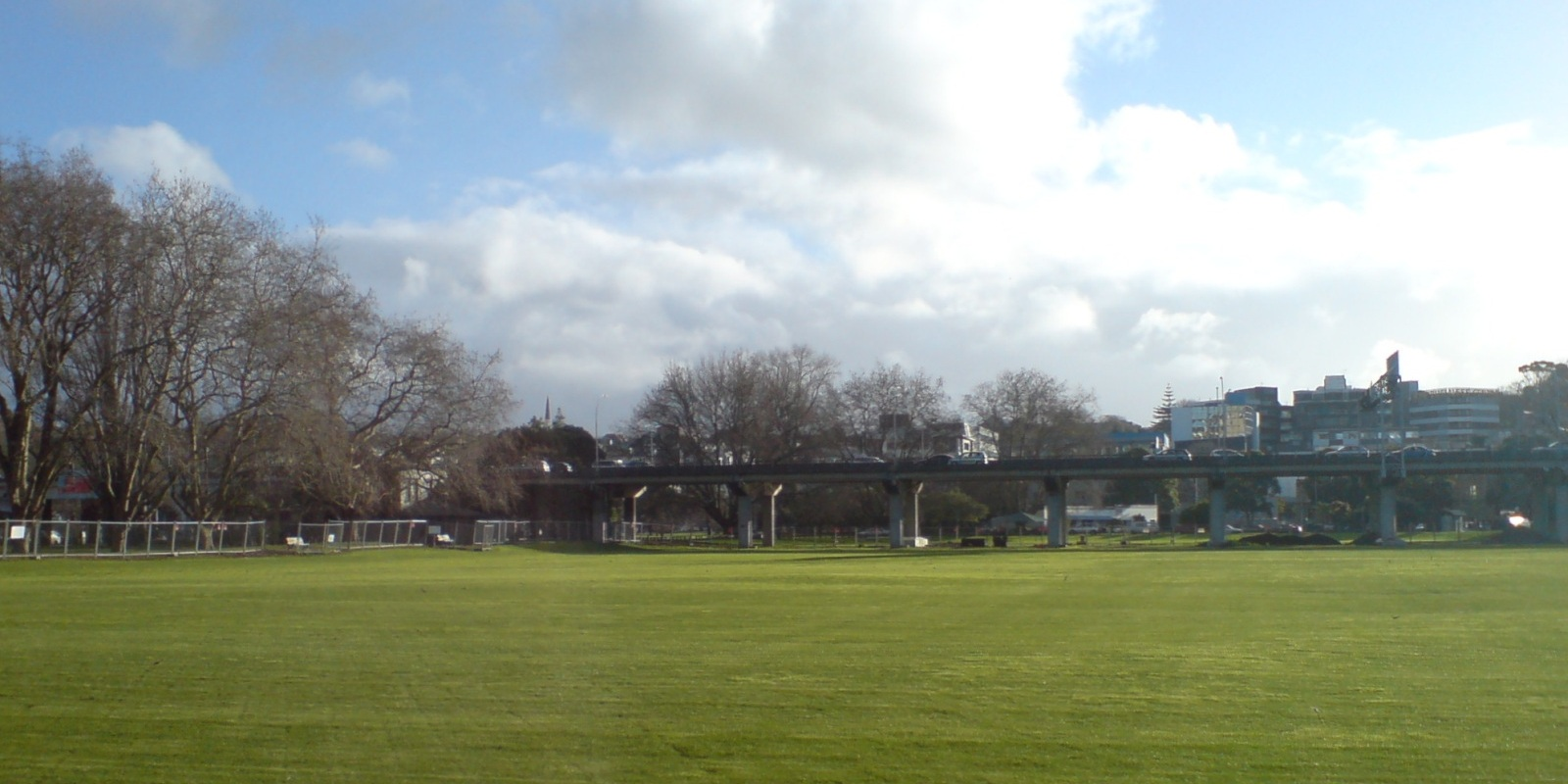
The Viaduct seen from Victoria Park.

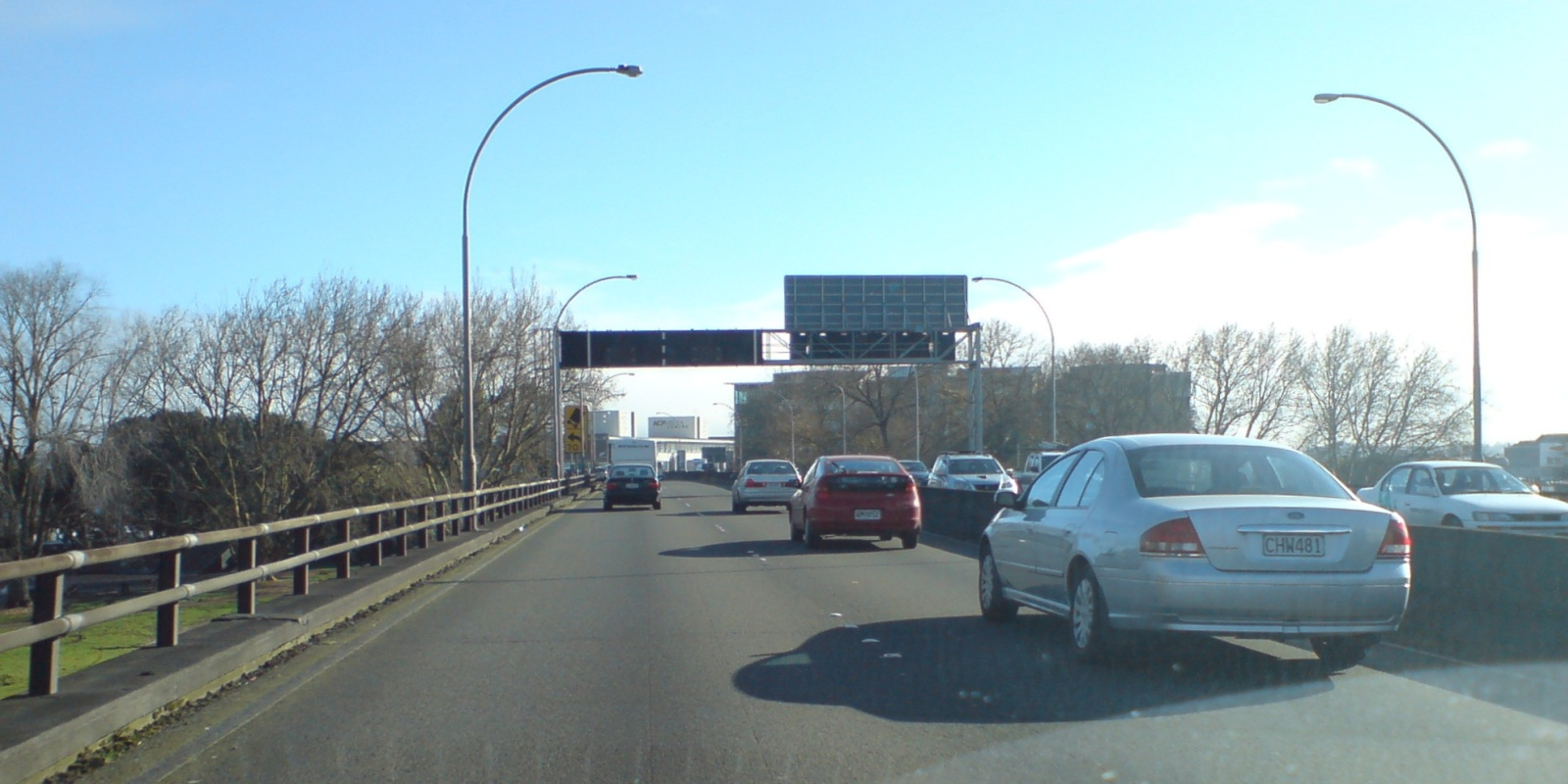
The viaduct during the interpeak time.

Map

The Victoria Park Viaduct is a major motorway viaduct carrying the Auckland Northern Motorway (State Highway 1) over the Victoria Park area in the Auckland city centre, New Zealand. Construction began in 1959, and the bridge was opened on 5 April 1962. Due to the high traffic volumes passing through on their way to and from North Shore City, and because the viaduct is only four lanes wide in total (while adjacent motorway stretches are at least six lanes), the bridge over the park is considered "one of the country's worst traffic bottlenecks", with around 200,000 vehicles a day.

After improvements to the Central Motorway Junction directly to the south in the early 2000s, Transit New Zealand, the highways authority, initially proposed a widening of the viaduct, which met with opposition from locals as well as from the Auckland City Council and the Auckland Regional Council, because it would further burden the Victoria Park area with more traffic and a larger overpass structure. In 2004, the authority agreed that instead of a second viaduct, the 'Vic Park Tunnel' should be built, carrying northbound traffic only west of the existing structure, freeing it for southbound traffic.

== See also ==
- Auckland Harbour Bridge
- Central Motorway Junction
- Newmarket Viaduct
- Victoria Park, Auckland
- Western Reclamation
