= Northwestern Motorway =

Motorway in Auckland, New Zealand

Northwestern Motorway

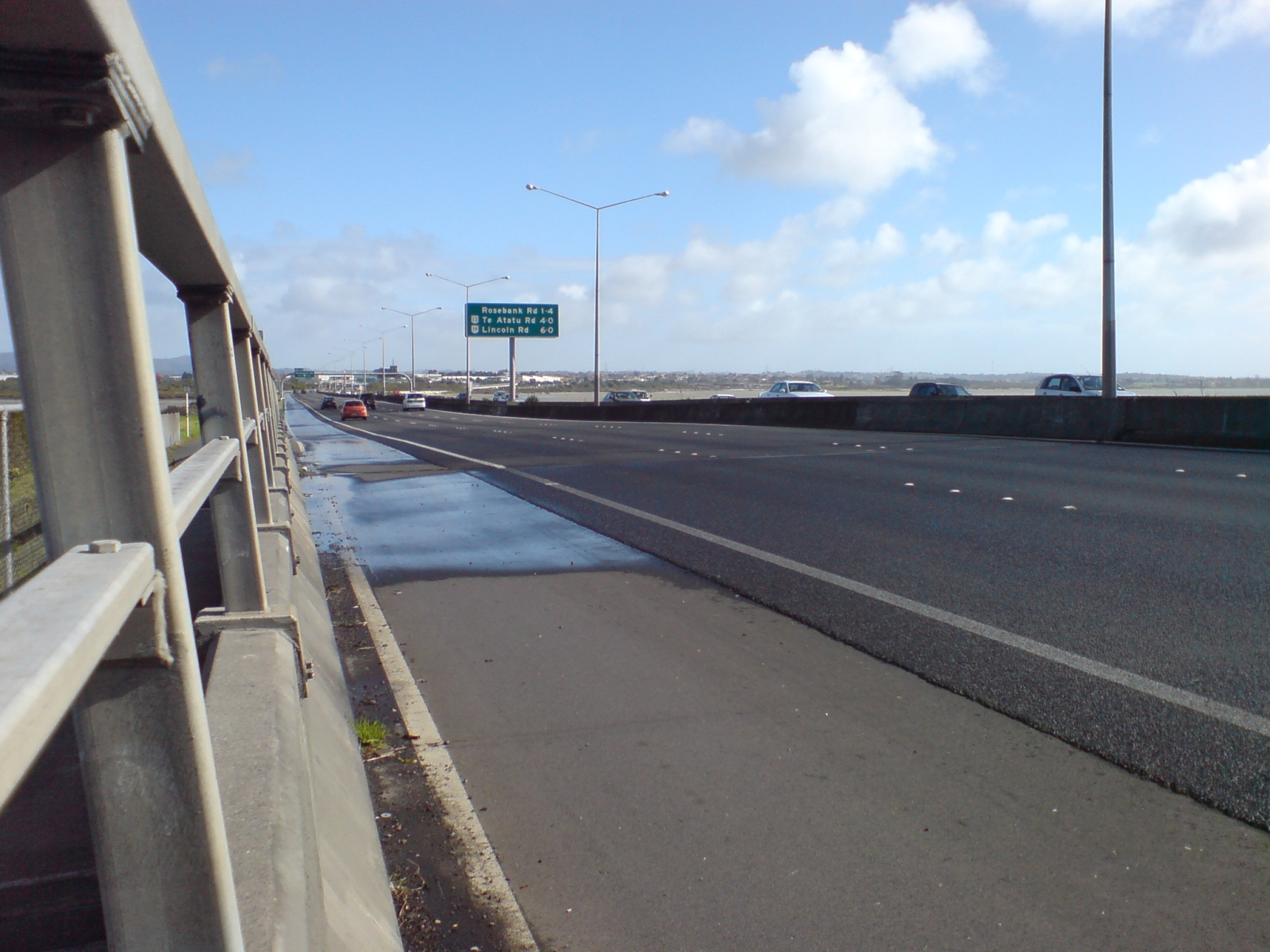
- The motorway west of Waterview

Route information
- Maintained by NZ Transport Agency
- Length: 21 km (13 mi)
- Existed: 1952–present
- Component highways: State Highway 16

Major junctions
- East end: SH 16 (Stanley Street) – Auckland CBD
- SH 1 (Northern Motorway/Southern Motorway) – Auckland CBD
- West end: Brigham Creek Road, Whenuapai

Location
- Country: New Zealand
- Primary destinations: Central Auckland, West Auckland

Highway system
- New Zealand state highways; Motorways and expressways; List

The Northwestern Motorway (also known historically as the Auckland–Kumeu Motorway), part of State Highway 16 (SH 16), is the major western route and secondary northern route out of Auckland in New Zealand. Twenty-one kilometres in length, the motorway runs from Stanley St in Parnell through the Central Motorway Junction, and west through Central Auckland and West Auckland before continuing northwest and terminating outside of Kumeū at the Brigham Creek Roundabout. A large part of it forms the middle section of the Western Ring Route.

== History ==
The first section of the Northwestern Motorway, from Waterview to Te Atatū Peninsula, was finished in 1952. The section between Waterview and Rosebank peninsula is known as "The Causeway". The next section opened for traffic in 1955, then offering a two-laned 7.8 km section from Great North Road (current Exit 8) to Lincoln Road (current Exit 16). The section involved bridges over inlets of the Waitematā Harbour, which cut the journey between central Auckland and its airport at Whenuapai by 8 km. This section was later upgraded to four lanes.

In 1957, the motorway was extended westwards by one km to Lincoln Park Avenue, between the current Lincoln Road and Royal Road interchanges. In 1961, it was extended again by 2.7 km to Hobsonville Road at what is now Westgate. Traffic could now travel 11.5 km on the Northwestern Motorway, and the journey between Auckland and Whenuapai was cut by a total of 9 km compared with local roads.

In 1966, the current Auckland International Airport opened at Mangere, and Whenuapai reverted to a military airport. This affected the use of the motorway, delaying further extensions.

Motorway construction recommenced in the late 1970s, to connect the Northwestern Motorway at Waterview to the Auckland city centre, bypassing Great North Road. The first section to open was in 1979, stretching 2.4 km from Newton Road (Exit 5) to Western Springs, at the current site of the eastbound on/off-ramps for St Lukes Road (Exit 6). At the same time, ramps opened as part of the Central Motorway Junction from Newton Road to Nelson Street and Hobson Street (now Exit 4B), connecting the Northwestern Motorway to the city centre. Traffic could access the Southern and Northern Motorways indirectly from the Nelson Street and Hobson Street intersections.

In 1981, the 2.4 km section between Great North Road at Waterview and Motions Road near Western Springs opened, leaving a small 1 km gap where traffic had to use Great North Road. This gap was filled in 1983 when the St Lukes Road interchange was completed.

In 1988, ramps were installed at the Central Motorway Junction to allow direct access between the Southern Motorway and the Northwestern Motorway. The following year, ramps opened between Grafton Gully and the Northwestern Motorway, allowing motorway traffic direct access to the eastern city centre and the port.

In 2006, two new ramps were installed to directly connect the Northwestern Motorway and the Northern Motorway.

On 7 August 2011 a 3 kilometre, 4-lane extension of the Northwestern Motorway opened from Hobsonville Road to Brigham Creek Road in Whenuapai, along with a 6 kilometre, 4-lane extension of State Highway 18 motorway from the end of the Northwestern Motorway at Hobsonville Road to the western end of Upper Harbour Bridge in Hobsonville.

From 2012 to 2016 extra lanes were added between St Lukes and Westgate in preparation for the opening, on 2 July 2017, of the Waterview Connection.

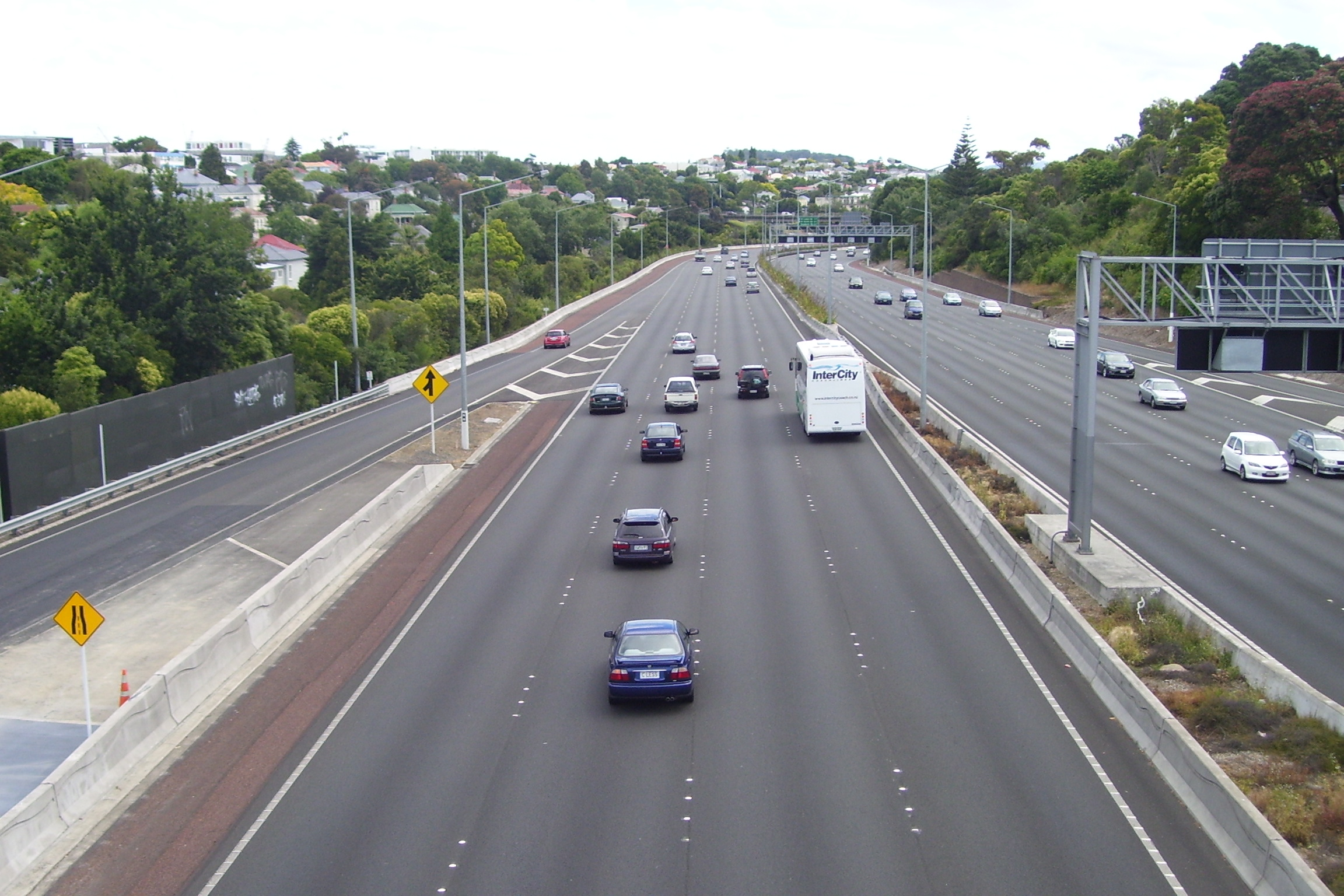
Looking west along the Northwestern Motorway between Newton Road and Bond Street.

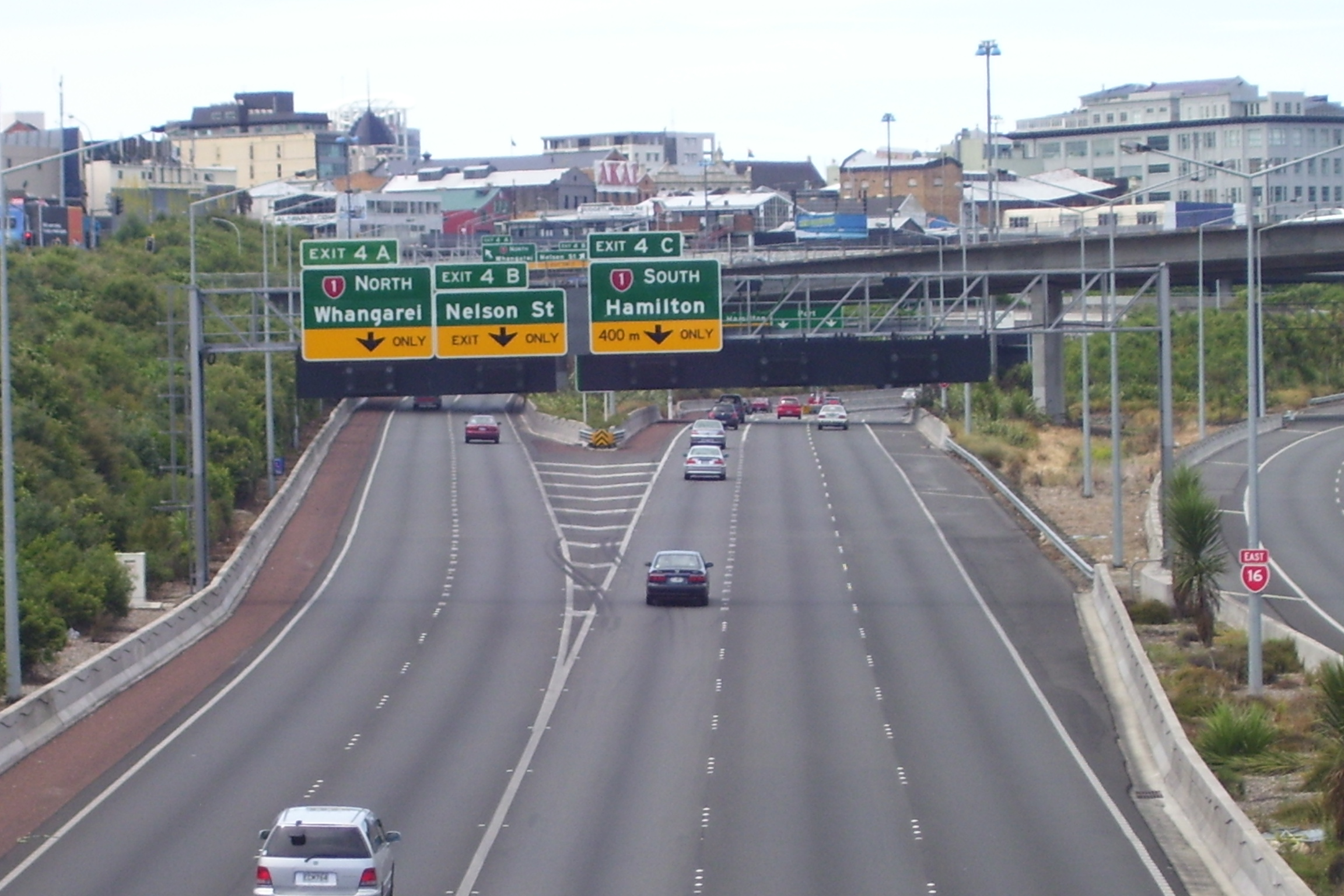
Looking east towards the Central Motorway Junction.

== Bridges ==
The Westgate footbridge crosses over the motorway near the Westgate interchange. The footbridge connects Massey with the Westgate shopping centre. The construction of the footbridge was in response to a fatality when a pedestrian tried to cross the motorway and was a joint project between the New Zealand Transport Agency and Auckland Transport.

== Interchanges ==
Location	km	mi	Exit	Destinations	Notes
Parnell	1.2	0.75		SH 16 east (Stanley Street) – Port	Northwestern Motorway begins
Grafton	1.7	1.1	2	SH 1 south (Southern Motorway) – Manukau, Hamilton	Westbound exit and eastbound entrance
Grafton	1.8	1.1	2A	Wellesley Street	Eastbound exit and westbound entrance
Auckland CBD	2.8	1.7	3	SH 1 north (Northern Motorway) – North Shore, Whangārei	Westbound exit and eastbound entrance
Auckland CBD	3.2	2.0	4C	SH 1 south (Southern Motorway) – Hamilton	Eastbound exit and westbound entrance
Auckland CBD	3.3	2.1	4A	SH 1 north (Northern Motorway) / Nelson Street – Whangārei	Eastbound exit and westbound entrance
Grey Lynn	3.5	2.2	5	Newton Road	Eastbound exit and westbound entrance
Western Springs	6.3	3.9	6	Route 9 (St Lukes Road) – Zoo, MOTAT	
Point Chevalier	8.0	5.0	8A	Route 11 (Great North Road)	
Point Chevalier	8.1	5.0	8B	SH 20 (Southwestern Motorway) – Manukau, Auckland Airport	Waterview Connection
Avondale North	10.8	6.7	11	Rosebank Road	Westbound exit and eastbound entrance
Avondale North	12.3	7.6	12	Patiki Road	Eastbound exit and westbound entrance
Te Atatū South	13.5	8.4	14	Route 13 (Te Atatu Road)	
Lincoln North	15.6	9.7	16	Route 19 (Lincoln Road)	
Massey East	17.8	11.1	18	Royal Road	Westbound exit and eastbound entrance
Westgate	19.4	12.1	19	SH 18 (Upper Harbour Motorway) / Route 32 (Hobsonville Road)	Westbound exit and eastbound entrance
Whenuapai	22.9	14.2		SH 16 north / Fred Taylor Drive / Brigham Creek Road – Kumeū, Wellsford	Roundabout; Northwestern Motorway ends
1.000 mi = 1.609 km; 1.000 km = 0.621 mi: Incomplete access

== See also ==
- List of motorways and expressways in New Zealand
- Northwestern Cycleway
