= List of motorways and expressways in New Zealand =

There are currently 428 km (266 mi) of motorways and expressways in New Zealand. 17 km (11 mi) are currently under construction, with a further 162 km (101 mi) expected to be completed by 2034, at which time a total of 605 km of motorway and expressway is expected.

Expressways in New Zealand are high standard all-purpose roads, usually dual carriageway, mainly for through traffic with no restrictions. Intersections may be controlled at-grade with roundabouts or traffic signals, or fully grade separated. Although there are no legal restrictions to pedestrian, cycle and animal traffic (as are applied to motorways,) pedestrian and animal traffic is strongly discouraged.

Motorways in New Zealand are dual carriageway roads designed for efficient high volume motor vehicle traffic. They have a no stopping restriction and are closed to pedestrian, cycle and animal traffic. Intersections are grade-separated.

== Summary ==
Name	State Highway(s)	Type	Length	First section opened
Auckland Northern Motorway	SH 1	Motorway	58 km (36 mi)	1959
Auckland Southern Motorway	SH 1	Motorway	44 km (27 mi)	1953
Waikato Expressway	SH 1	Expressway	101 km (63 mi)	1995
Kāpiti Expressway	SH 1	Expressway	31 km (19 mi)	2017
Transmission Gully Motorway	SH 1	Motorway	27 km (17 mi)	2022
Johnsonville–Porirua Motorway	SH 1; SH 59	Motorway	11 km (7 mi)	1950
Wellington Urban Motorway	SH 1	Motorway	7 km (4 mi)	1969
Christchurch Northern Motorway	SH 1; SH 74	Motorway	16 km (10 mi)	1967
Western Belfast Bypass	SH 1	Motorway	5 km (3 mi)	2017
Dunedin Southern Motorway	SH 1	Expressway (Kensington–Lookout Point); Motorway (Lookout Point–Mosgiel)	13 km (8 mi)	1972
Tauranga Eastern Link	SH 2	Expressway (Te Maunga–Papamoa); Motorway (Papamoa–Paengaroa)	23 km (14 mi)	2015
Northwestern Motorway	SH 16	Motorway	21 km (13 mi)	1952
Upper Harbour Motorway	SH 18	Motorway	12 km (7 mi)	2007
Southwestern Motorway	SH 20	Motorway	24 km (15 mi)	1977
Auckland Airport Motorway	SH 20A	Motorway	4 km (2 mi)	1997
Christchurch Southern Motorway	SH 76; SH 1	Motorway	19 km (12 mi)	1981

=== Under construction ===
Name	State Highway(s)	Type	Length	Expected opening
Takitimu North Link (Stage 1: Tauranga to Te Puna)	SH 2	Expressway	7 km (4 mi)	mid 2028
SH29 Tauriko West	SH 29	Expressway	4 km (2 mi)	2039
Hawkes Bay Expressway (Stage 1)	SH 2	Expressway	6 km (4 mi)	2028

=== Approved ===
Name	State Highway(s)	Type	Length	Expected opening
Takitimu North Link (Stage 2: Te Puna to Ōmokoroa)	SH 2	Expressway	7 km (4 mi)	2034
Northland Expressway (Whangarei to Marsden Point)	SH 1	Expressway	22 km (14 mi)	Unknown
Kāpiti Expressway (Ōtaki to north of Levin)	SH 1	Expressway	24 km (15 mi)	2029
Northland Expressway (Brynderwyn Bypass)	SH 1	Expressway	50 km (31 mi)	2034
Ara Tūhono (Warkworth to Wellsford)	SH 1	Motorway	26 km (16 mi)	2034
East – West Link	SH ?	Motorway	6 km (4 mi)	2034
North West Alternative State Highway	SH 16	Motorway	10 km (6 mi)	2034
Waikato Expressway (Cambridge to Piarere)	SH 1	Expressway	16 km (10 mi)	2033
Hawkes Bay Expressway (Stage 2)	SH 2	Expressway	5 km (3 mi)	2030
Hawkes Bay Expressway (Stage 3)	SH 2	Expressway	5 km (3 mi)	2034
Hawkes Bay Expressway (Stage 4)	SH 2	Expressway	11 km (7 mi)	2034
Christchurch Northern Motorway (Belfast to Pegasus and Woodend Bypass)	SH 1	Motorway	9 km (6 mi)	2034

== Auckland ==
=== Northern Motorway (SH 1) ===
From the Central Motorway Junction in central Auckland via the Auckland Harbour Bridge and the North Shore to Warkworth.

=== Northwestern Motorway (SH 16) ===
From Parnell to Brigham Creek Rd, Whenuapai.

=== Southwestern Motorway (SH 20) ===
From the Southern Motorway in Manukau City to the Northwestern Motorway at Waterview.

=== Southern Motorway (SH 1) ===
From central Auckland via Manukau City to the Bombay Hills and transitioning into the Waikato Expressway.

=== Upper Harbour Motorway (SH 18) ===
Connecting the Northwestern and Northern Motorways via the Upper Harbour Bridge. Construction of the Northern Corridor connection between the Northern and Upper Harbour Motorways commenced in 2018, and the full interchange opened in 2023.

=== Auckland Airport Motorway (SH 20A) ===
From the Southwestern Motorway in Māngere to George Bolt Memorial Dr, Auckland Airport

== Waikato ==
=== Waikato Expressway (SH 1) ===
An expressway between the Southern Motorway at Bombay and Cambridge, By 2007 SH 1 between Longswamp and Rangiriri was three lanes with a median barrier. In 2012 the Te Rapa Spur was opened, followed by the Ngāruawāhia section in 2013. The Cambridge bypass opened on 16 December 2015, six months ahead of schedule. The route has now been fully designated, and funding was secured for the Huntly and Hamilton sections. The Huntly section opened in March 2020, but the Hamilton section was delayed due to the COVID-19 pandemic. Since then the Hamilton Section was completed on the 12th July 2022 and was opened to traffic on the 14th of July 2022. The 15 km Cambridge Section now has a 110kmph speed limit for light vehicles as of 11 December 2017.

== Bay of Plenty ==
=== Takitimu Drive (Pyes Pa – Mount Maunganui Expressway) (SH 2/SH 29) ===
From Pyes Pa to Chapel Street near the city centre. An interchange exists with Tamatea Arikinui Drive, along with a "coat-hanger" interchange, which is used with Elizabeth Street and heads north towards Mt Maunganui. The section from Pyes Pa to the SH 2 interchange is tolled. From 1 August 2015 it was added to the New Zealand state highway network as part of SH 29.

=== Tamatea Arikinui Drive (Bethlehem – The Avenues Expressway) (SH 2) ===
From 15th Avenue to just before Bethlehem Town Centre, with interchanges at Cambridge Road, Waihi Road and Takitimu Drive (Pyes Pa – City Expressway).

=== Tauranga Eastern Link (SH 2) ===
Connects Tauranga to Paengaroa (with SH 33) via Papamoa, bypassing Te Puke. In late 2006 the first phase was opened from Maungatapu to Bayfair. Full motorway was completed in 2015 with the tolled section between Papamoa and Paengaroa opened to the public in August that year. The tolled section from Papamoa to Paengaroa now has speed limit for light vehicles of 110 kmph as of 11 December 2017

== Hawke's Bay ==
=== Hawke's Bay Expressway (SH 2 / SH 50) ===
From Hawke's Bay Airport near Napier to Pakipaki, south of Hastings. The entire expressway is part of SH 2, with approximately 8 km (5.0 mi) also concurrent with SH 50.

== Wellington ==
=== Johnsonville-Porirua Motorway (SH 1 / SH 59) ===
Approximately 11 km (6.8 mi) in length, this is New Zealand's first motorway; the first section opening in 1950. The section of the motorway between the southern terminus at Johnsonville and the interchange with the Transmission Gully Motorway forms part of SH 1, with the small 2.1 km (1.3 mi) section north of this point forming part of SH 59.

=== Wellington Urban Motorway (SH 1) ===
From Ngauranga to Te Aro, 7 km (4.3 mi)

=== Kāpiti Expressway (SH 1) ===
The Kāpiti Expressway is a four-lane grade-separated expressway, stretching 33 km (21 mi) from Mackays Crossing north of Paekākāriki to just north of Ōtaki on the Kapiti Coast. It carries traffic through Raumati, Paraparaumu, Waikanae and Ōtaki. The section from Mackays Crossing to Raumati South was completed in 2007 with the grade separation of the Mackays railway level crossing. Work on the Raumati to Peka Peka section started in December 2013 and opened on 24 February 2017, with minor finishing works completed by July. Construction of the section from Peka Peka north to Ōtaki commenced in late 2017 and opened in December 2022.

=== Transmission Gully Motorway (SH 1) ===
Officially opened on 30 March 2022, from Mackays Crossing near Paekākāriki to the Johnsonville-Porirua Motorway in Linden, bypassing Centennial Highway.

=== Hutt Expressway (Hutt Road, Western Hutt Road, River Road) (SH 2) ===
From the Wellington Urban Motorway at Ngauranga through the Hutt Valley to the Fergusson Drive intersection at Maoribank in northern Upper Hutt. It has three names: Hutt Road from Ngauranga to Petone, Western Hutt Road from Petone to Silverstream, and River Road from Silverstream to Maoribank. 30 km (19 mi).

The section south of Melling is dual carriage and is fully grade separated. The section from Melling north to Silverstream is dual carriage with a mixture of at-grade and grade separated intersections. The section north of Silverstream is a 2+1 road with at grade intersections.

== Canterbury ==
=== Christchurch Northern Motorway (SH 1) ===
From north of Kaiapoi over the Waimakariri River through to the northern suburb of Belfast. Its southernmost interchange (Kainga/Marshland) is unusual in that northbound traffic merges from the right, while southbound traffic is carried on a large loop to the right up and over the onramp. The reason for this design was to accommodate a future southern extension into central Christchurch, with the northbound onramp being the first part of the northbound carriageway. Northbound there are three more interchanges; Tram Road (Oxford), north off, south on; Kaiapoi (diamond interchange); and Lineside Road (SH 71 to Rangiora), north off, south on. It is dual carriageway from Belfast (Main North Road) to Lineside Road, single lane each way with no median strip to Woodend.

=== Christchurch Southern Motorway (SH 76 / SH 1) ===
Short motorway bypassing a part of southern Christchurch city. Lost its status as a motorway after plans to extend the original section (between Curletts Road and Barrington Street, which was built in the early 1980s) stalled. Since 2012, the road has been extended Curletts Road to Halswell Junction Road with the original section widened to four lanes and interchanges at both Curletts Road and Barrington Street), thereby regaining motorway status. In 2020, extended to rejoin SH 1 at Templeton and continue alongside SH 1 until just west of Rolleston.

=== Christchurch-Lyttelton Motorway (SH 74) ===
From the intersection of Ferry and Dyers Roads along Tunnel Road through the Lyttelton Tunnel to the intersection of Norwich Quay and Simeon Quay. It is single lane with interchanges at Bridle Path and Port Hills Road. There is a passing lane southbound from the Port Hills Road interchange.

=== Western Belfast Bypass (SH 1) ===
The motorway links directly from the Christchurch Northern Motorway, at Chaneys interchange, to Johns Road at the Clearwater roundabout, bypassing the current section of State Highway One through the Belfast urban area.

== Otago ==
=== Former Dunedin Northern Motorway (SH 1) ===
This undivided highway had its "motorway" signs removed in 2002, and is now officially called the Dunedin-Waitati Highway, although it is still referred to by Dunedinites as "the northern motorway".

It runs from Pine Hill to Waitati, and is the main route north from Dunedin.

=== Caversham Bypass (SH 1) ===
From Dunedin CBD to Caversham, SH1 has been widened to a four-lane road over its full length. It becomes the Dunedin Southern Motorway at its western end, close to Lookout Point. At its eastern end, it joins Dunedin's central city one-way street system.

=== Dunedin Southern Motorway (SH 1) ===
This route runs from South Dunedin to Mosgiel. The section from Lookout Point at the southwestern end of Caversham, past the outer suburbs of Green Island, Abbotsford and Fairfield, to the intersection with SH 87 at Mosgiel, is classified as motorway. It is one of the southernmost motorways in the world. The length of the motorway is 13 km.

== See also ==
- New Zealand state highway network
