= State Highway 18 (New Zealand) =

Road in New Zealand

State Highway 18
- Upper Harbour Motorway

Route information
- Maintained by NZ Transport Agency Waka Kotahi
- Length: 14 km (8.7 mi)

Major junctions
- North-east end: SH 1 (Auckland Northern Motorway) at North Shore
- South-west end: SH 16 south (Northwestern Motorway) at West Harbour

Location
- Country: New Zealand
- Primary destinations: Greenhithe, Hobsonville

Highway system
- New Zealand state highways; Motorways and expressways; List
← SH 17	→ SH 19

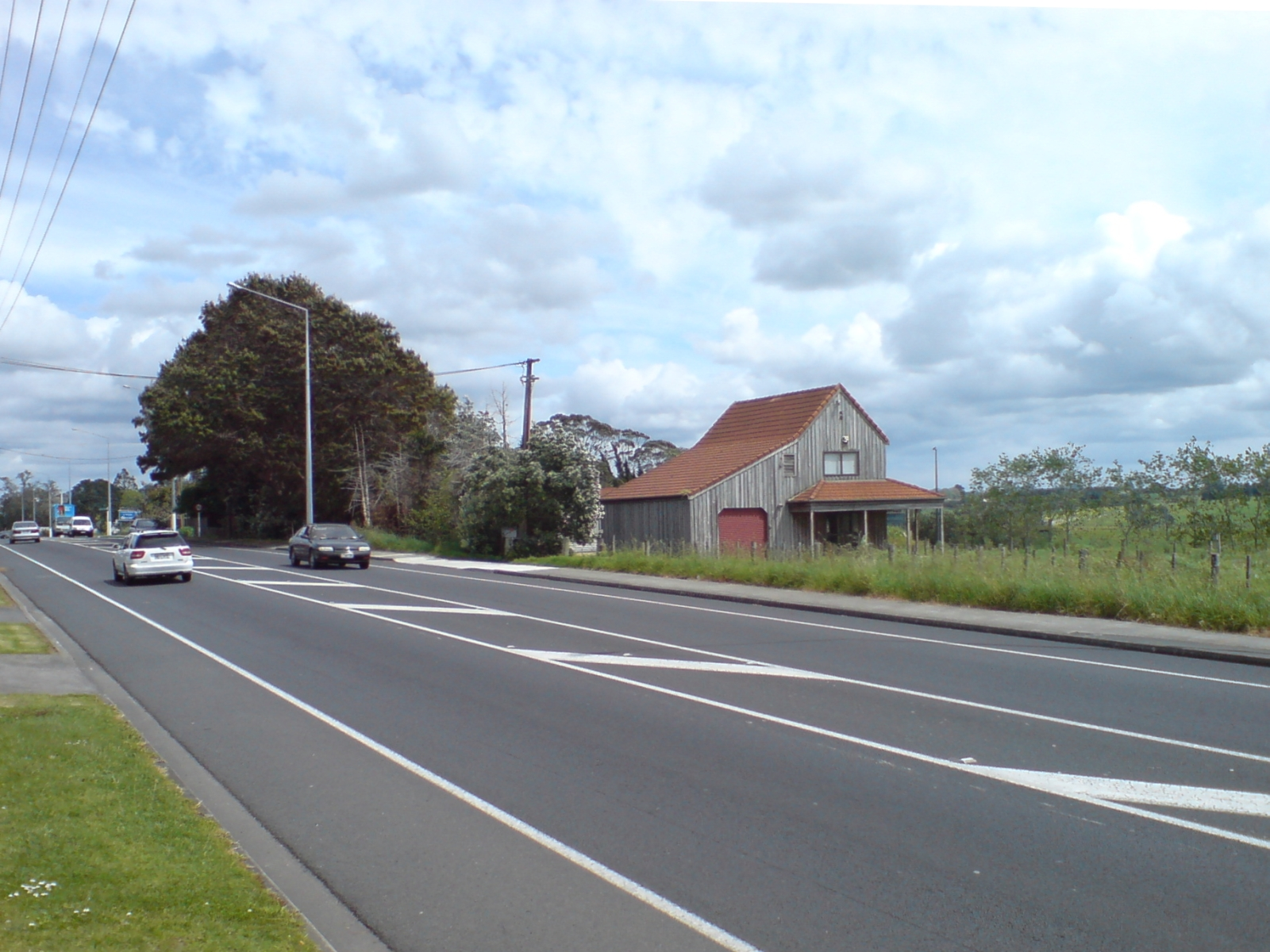
The former route of State Highway 18, in 2010, was a mostly rural highway. This route is now designated Urban route 32.

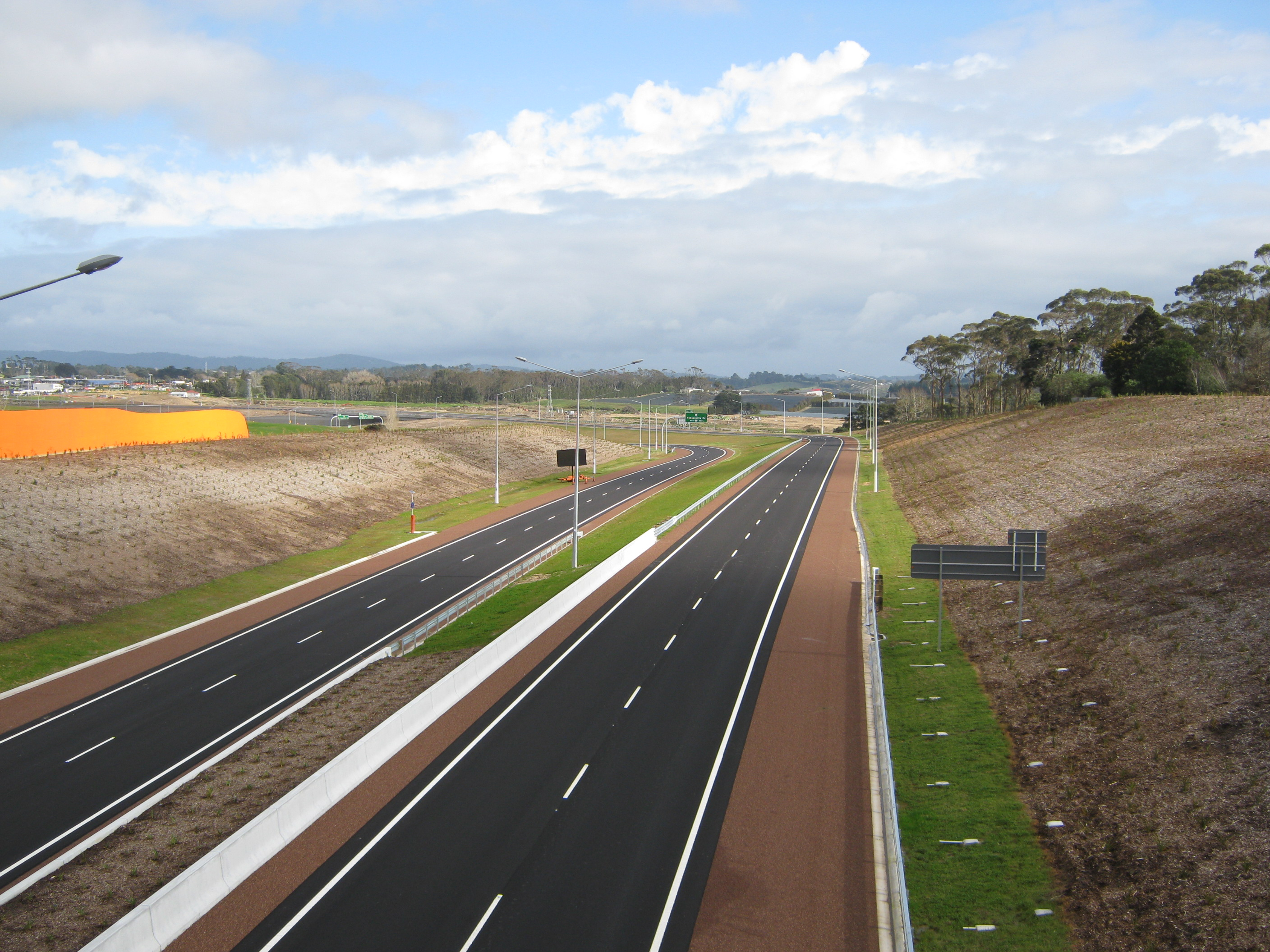
The Hobsonville section of the Upper Harbour Motorway, looking west from the Trig Road Interchange

State Highway 18 (SH 18), also known as the Upper Harbour Motorway, is a state highway that runs between the Auckland Northern Motorway (SH 1) on the North Shore and the Northwestern Motorway (SH 16) in West Auckland, New Zealand. SH 18 forms the northern part of the Western Ring Route, which continues from Waitakere south-east to Manukau.

== Route ==
SH 18 begins at the Auckland Northern Motorway and runs southwest towards the Albany Highway interchange, and is coextensive with the Upper Harbour Highway. This four-lane section of motorway opened in December 2007, and bypassed the single carriageway Upper Harbour Drive. The motorway heads south-west, crossing the upper reaches of the Waitematā Harbour over the Upper Harbour Bridge. At Squadron Drive, the highway extends onto a new section of motorway, which opened in August 2011, bypassing Hobsonville Road. This road cuts across in a southwestern direction across farmland to Westgate, where it turns southward and merges with the Northwestern Motorway (SH 16) southbound.

In 2023, the Northern Corridor Improvements project upgraded the Upper Harbour Highway section east of Albany Highway to motorway standard, as far as an incomplete interchange with the realigned Paul Matthews Road. Two two-lane ramps connect northbound and westbound traffic to the SH 1 Northern Motorway. However this interchange is also incomplete. Traffic from SH 18 wanting to head south on SH 1, or northbound traffic on SH 1 wanting to head west on SH 18, must use the remaining section of Upper Harbour Highway (renamed to Constellation Drive) between SH 1 and the Paul Matthews Road interchange.

== Interchanges ==
Territorial authority	Location	km	mi	Exit	Destinations	Notes
Auckland – Upper Harbour Local Board	Unsworth Heights	0.0	0.0		SH 1 south (Northern Motorway) – Auckland	SH 18 and Upper Harbour Motorway begins
Auckland – Upper Harbour Local Board	Unsworth Heights				SH 1 north (Northern Motorway) – Whangarei	
Auckland – Upper Harbour Local Board	Unsworth Heights	0.5	0.31	1	Caribbean Drive; Paul Matthews Road	Eastbound exit and westbound entrance
Auckland – Upper Harbour Local Board	Unsworth Heights	2.4	1.5	2	Route 26 (Albany Highway)	
Auckland – Upper Harbour Local Board	Greenhithe	4.3	2.7	4	Greenhithe Road	Westbound exit and eastbound entrance
Auckland – Upper Harbour Local Board	Greenhithe	6.2	3.9	6	Tauhinu Road	Eastbound exit and Westbound entrance
Auckland – Upper Harbour Local Board	Greenhithe	7.4	4.6	Upper Harbour Bridge (Waitematā Harbour)		
Auckland – Upper Harbour Local Board	Hobsonville	8.8	5.5	8	Squadron Drive	Westbound exit and eastbound entrance
Auckland – Upper Harbour Local Board	Hobsonville	10.7	6.6	9	Brigham Creek Road – Whenuapai, Wellsford	to SH 16 north
Auckland – Upper Harbour Local Board	Hobsonville	12.7	7.9	10	Trig Road	Westbound exit and eastbound entrance
Auckland – Henderson-Massey Local Board	Westgate	13.9	8.6	11	Route 32 (Hobsonville Road)	Westbound exit and eastbound entrance
Auckland – Henderson-Massey Local Board	Westgate	14.0	8.7		SH 16 south (Northwestern Motorway) – Waitakere, Auckland	SH 18 and Upper Harbour Motorway ends
1.000 mi = 1.609 km; 1.000 km = 0.621 mi: Incomplete access

== Former route ==
SH 18 formerly ran along the Coatesville Riverhead Highway, further north than its current position. This route is now designated as Auckland Urban Route 28.

Upper Harbour Drive was designated as SH 18 until the opening of the first stage of the Upper Harbour Motorway in 2007. It was then gazetted as SH 18A on 15 November 2007, though it was not signposted; only street maps noted this change. Upper Harbour Drive then had its state highway designation fully revoked by October 2012.

== Cycleway ==
The route of the new motorway from Upper Harbour Bridge to Westgate was originally to receive a cycleway as well, but although the land was set aside, there is no timetable for the construction of the route. A shared path was constructed in 2023 between Constellation Drive and the Albany Highway interchange, as part of the Auckland Northern Corridor works.

== See also ==
- List of New Zealand state highways
