= Second Harbour Crossing (disambiguation) =

Second Harbour Crossing may refer to:

- The Upper Harbour Bridge, an existing twin motorway bridge over the Waitemata Harbour in Auckland, New Zealand.
- Second Harbour Crossing, Auckland, a proposed second transport link over the Waitematā Harbour in Auckland, New Zealand.
- The Sydney Harbour Tunnel, an existing twin-tube road tunnel crossing of Sydney Harbour in New South Wales, Australia.
- The Western Harbour Tunnel, an under-construction extension of the M8 Motorway beneath Sydney Harbour in New South Wales, Australia.
- Sydney Metro City & Southwest, a rapid transit rail line that extends the M1 Metro North West & Bankstown Line beneath Sydney Harbour in New South Wales, Australia.
- The Eastern Harbour Crossing, a twin-tube road tunnel crossing of Victoria Harbour in Hong Kong.
- The Twin Sails Bridge, a double-leaved bascule bridge in Poole, Dorset, England.

== See also ==
- Harbour Crossing (disambiguation)
