= Transport in Auckland =

Transport in Auckland, New Zealand's largest city, is defined by factors that include the shape of the Auckland isthmus (with its harbours creating chokepoints and long distances for land transport), the suburban character of much of the urban area, a history (since World War II) of focusing investment on roading projects rather than public transport, and high car-ownership rates.

These factors have contributed to a transport system that is highly dependent on private motor vehicles. Several motorways radiating to the north, northwest, southwest and south act as the backbone of the city's road network, with the busiest section of motorway carrying over 200,000 vehicles a day. The use of public transport in Auckland was high until the 1950s but subsequently declined during the second half of the 20th century, before experiencing a strong resurgence from the early 2000s. With the motorway network now largely completed, major efforts are underway to increase public transport use to address Auckland's congestion. Recent efforts have also focused on making cycling a safer and more attractive transport option.

Auckland has New Zealand's largest commercial port (mostly used for international commerce) and the country's largest international airport. It also has the Southern Hemisphere's largest marina.

== History ==
=== Pre-European period ===
Throughout Auckland's pre-European period, its strategic location on the Waitematā and Manukau harbours had important transport implications. Māori hauled waka (canoes) between the harbours at portages, short traversable sections of land that connected the bodies of water. Some of the most major portages were Te Tō Waka, the shortest portage located at Ōtāhuhu, Te Tōanga Waka (the Whau River portage), as well as Te Pai o Kaiwaka, the Waiuku portage which connected the Manukau Harbour to the Waikato River in the south, and Te Tōangaroa in the north-west, connecting the Waitematā and Kaipara harbours overland at Kumeū.

=== 19th and early 20th century ===
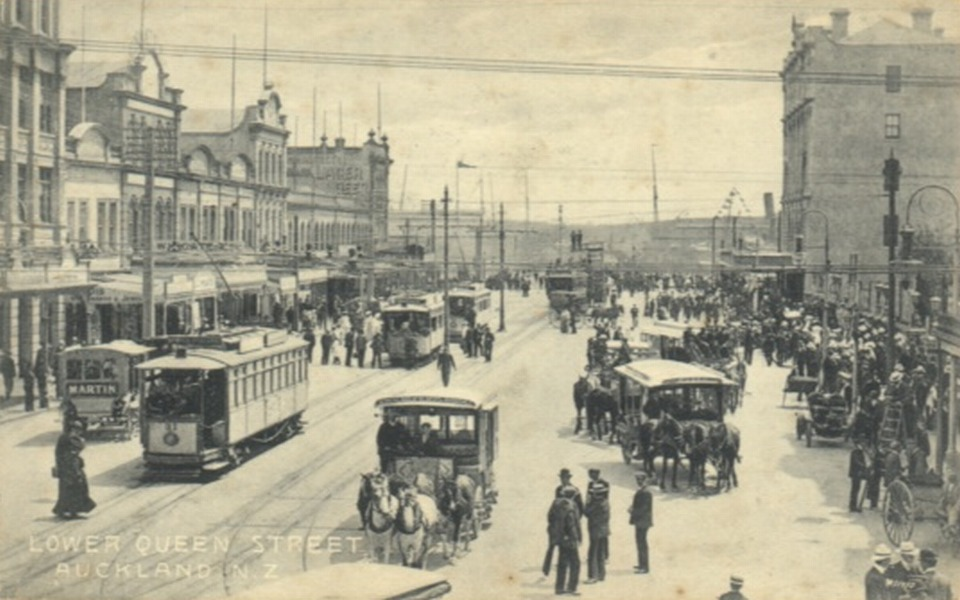
Lower Queen Street in 1919, with trams, cars and horse-drawn taxis visible.

As a port city, Auckland's initial (19th century) urban growth occurred in an intense fashion, concentrated around the harbour in a similar manner to most other mercantile cities, with lack of transportation options limiting development to locations within walking distance of each other. The overcrowding of the inner city eventually created a demand for expansion made viable when new transportation technology appeared around 1900 in the form of streetcars (trams) and railways arriving in Auckland.

Auckland's first tram line, from the CBD to Ponsonby via Karangahape Road, opened on 24 November 1902. As the system grew, it facilitated the expansion of Auckland's built-up area in two ways: in an intermittent linear pattern to the west and south along the railway line, and in a more continuous manner along the main routes. The demand for more living space from people who had been confined to the crowded downtown area coupled with an affordable and reliable transport network led to the creation of many of Auckland's original suburbs, along Great North Road, New North Road, Sandringham Road, Dominion Road, Mt Eden Road, Manukau Road and Remuera Road, forming a new arc of suburban development by 1915.

Auckland first railway, to Onehunga, opened in 1873. Expansion of the railway network facilitated growth in more distant locations such as Ōtāhuhu and New Lynn, while ferries served Devonport, Takapuna and Birkenhead on the North Shore. Auckland's urban development in the early twentieth century is intrinsically linked to its transport networks, and because of their limited reach the city developed in a fairly compact manner to maximise the efficiency of the tram, railway and ferry systems. However, this situation was not to last for long, as even before the Second World War the car was becoming an integral part of life for many New Zealanders, opening up previously unreachable land for development.

=== Late 20th century ===
The number of cars in New Zealand skyrocketed from 69,521 in 1925 (when registration was first established) to 194,217 in 1938. This growing popularity meant that urban development could break free from the constraints of transport networks and occur anywhere roads were built. This led to a rapid decentralisation of urban growth, today often referred to as urban sprawl, in the 30 years after World War II. In an effort to compete with increasingly popular suburban shopping malls, parking lots and later parking buildings were built in the city centre. The first municipal parking building (Britomart Place) was completed in 1958.

The tram system was dismantled in the 1950s and subsequent efforts to improve the rail network were not implemented. Meanwhile, a substantial motorway network was developed that facilitated urban growth to the north, northwest and south. These decisions led to Auckland becoming a highly car dependent city.

Auckland Airport moved to its current site near Māngere in 1966, having been previously located in Whenuapai.

=== 21st century ===
Continued strong population growth, combined with cheaper car imports, led to growing traffic congestion across much of Auckland in the 1990s and early 2000s.

In response to growing congestion, central and local government increased transport investment from around $500 million a year in 2000 to over $2 billion in 2015. This increased investment largely completed Auckland's motorway network, funded the upgrade and electrification of the city's rail network, and supported construction of the Northern Busway.

Despite these improvements, rapid population growth means that transport is still a major challenge for Auckland, with congestion costing the city around $1.3 billion a year. In 2009, Paul Mees, an Australian academic who had advocated for greater public transport adoption said Auckland had "the most unbalanced transport policies of just about [any city] in the world" alongside other academics who believed the city had underinvested in public transportation.

== Road transport ==
=== Overview ===
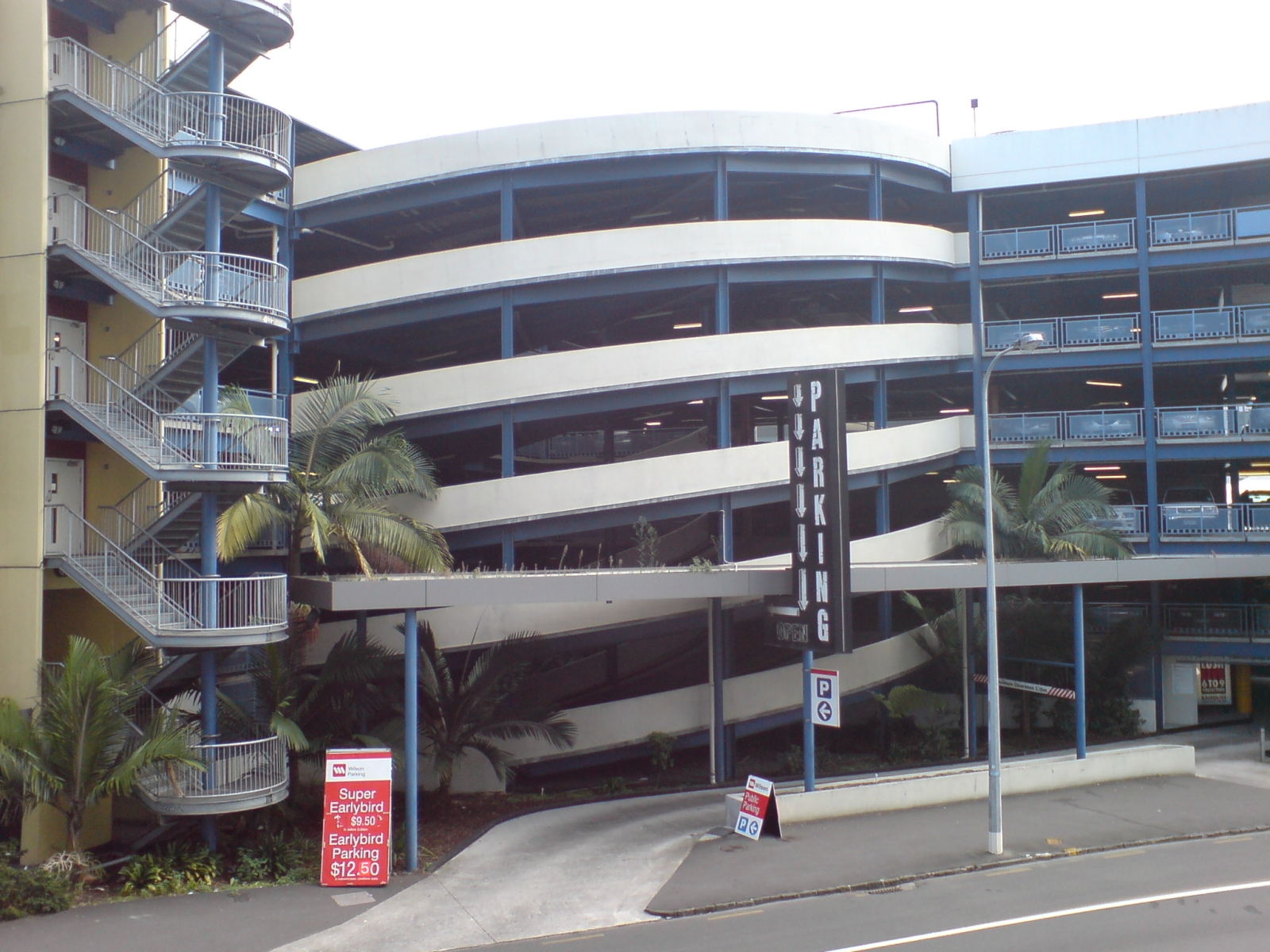
Auckland's downtown has a number of parking buildings.

There are over 7,000 km of roads in the Auckland region made up of motorways, arterial roads and local streets.

- All motorways in Auckland are state highways, owned and operated by the New Zealand Transport Agency. These routes have multiple lanes in each direction, speed limits of 80–100 km/h and limited access.
- Most arterial roads and local streets are owned and operated by Auckland Transport (AT). Some arterial roads (mainly in rural areas but also state highways 20A and 20B that provide access to Auckland Airport) are classified as state highways and are owned and operated by the New Zealand Transport Agency. These routes range from multi-lane arterial roads with over 50,000 vehicles a day to unsealed rural roads.

=== Motorway network ===
An extensive motorway network was planned for Auckland in the 1950s and 1960s. Auckland's first motorway was a 3.2 kilometre section of the Southern Motorway, between Penrose and Mt Wellington, that was opened in 1953. By 2017 there was over 220 km of motorways in Auckland, carrying over 900,000 trips per day on the following routes:

- Northern Motorway (State Highway 1 between the Auckland city centre and Puhoi). This motorway includes the Auckland Harbour Bridge and is the main connection between Auckland and Northland, as well as the key route linking the North Shore with the Auckland isthmus.
- Southern Motorway (State Highway 1 between the Auckland city centre and the Bombay Hills). This motorway includes the Newmarket viaduct, passes through the Central Motorway junction and is the main connection between Auckland and Waikato, as well as the key route linking South Auckland with the Auckland isthmus.
- Northwestern Motorway (State Highway 16 between the Auckland city centre and Whenuapai). This motorway is the main connection to the northwest part of Auckland, links to the Waterview Tunnel (thereby being the key route between the city centre and Auckland Airport) and forms part of the Western Ring Route.
- Upper Harbour Motorway (State Highway 18 between Westgate and Albany). This motorway is the main connection between West Auckland and the North Shore, via the Upper Harbour Bridge.
- Southwestern Motorway (State Highway 20 between Waterview and Manukau). This motorway forms a large part of the Western Ring Route that bypasses central Auckland, provides access to Auckland Airport and includes the Māngere Bridge and Waterview Tunnel.

Because of Auckland's geography and road network layout, many motorways also have arterial road functions and are used for short-distance trips. Access to the motorway network is controlled through ramp signals, which regulate the flow of traffic onto the motorway. While this causes delays and vehicle queues when getting onto the motorway, it produces smoother through flows on the motorway itself.

=== Major arterial roads ===
Around 16% of Auckland's overall road network is classified as either a primary or secondary arterial road. These roads generally have a speed limit of 50 km/h in urban areas and serve a wide variety of functions, providing for the movement of people, goods and services as well as public transport services, cycleways, on-street parking and access to businesses and residences.

	Major arterial roads
Northern Auckland	Whangaparaoa Road, Hibiscus Coast Highway, Coatesville-Riverhead Highway, East Coast Road, Albany Highway, Dairy Flat Highway, Oteha Valley Road, Constellation Drive, Wairau Road, Glenfield Road, Onewa Road, Taharoto Road, Northcote Road, Lake Road
West Auckland	Hobsonville Road, Brigham Creek Road, Don Buck Road, Lincoln Road, Te Atatu Road, Great North Road, Rata Street, Clark Street
Central Auckland	New North Road, Carrington Road, Mt Albert Road, Dominion Road, Balmoral Road, St Lukes Road, Greenlane (East and West), Remuera Road, Manukau Road, Broadway, Great South Road, Ellerslie-Panmure Highway, Te Horeta Road, Neilson Street, Church Street
East Auckland	Pakuranga Road, Ti Rakau Drive, Botany Road, Te Irirangi Drive
South Auckland	Highbrook Drive, East Tamaki Road, Chapel Road, Great South Road, Harris Road, Mill Road, Redoubt Road, Mangere Road

To best balance their wide variety of different functions, at peak times some roads have bus or carpool lanes, while on-street parking is frequently restricted.

=== Key infrastructure ===
Key bridges, tunnels and interchanges are critical to the functioning of Auckland's road network. Major pieces of infrastructure include:

- Auckland Harbour Bridge. Opened in 1959, this bridge is 1,020 m (3,348 ft) long, with a main span of 243.8 m, rising 43.27 m above high water. It forms part of the Northern Motorway and is the critical link between the North Shore and central Auckland. The bridge was extended in 1969 by constructing cantilevered 'clip-on' lanes at both outer sides of the original construction, giving it 8 lanes in total (from 4 lanes before). As this eventually was still not enough to manage growing traffic loads, a traffic management solution involving a movable barrier was installed, giving it 5 lanes per dominant direction depending on the time of day.
- Upper Harbour Bridge. This bridge in the northwest of Auckland is an important connection between west Auckland and the North Shore and carries the Upper Harbour Motorway. The original two lane bridge, opened in the 1970s, was substantially upgraded in 2007 as part of the Greenhithe Deviation project. It now forms part of the Western Ring Route.
- Central Motorway Junction. The Northern Motorway, Southern Motorway and Northwestern Motorway all converge in central Auckland in a motorway junction (known locally as Spaghetti Junction due to its complexity). A series of upgrades were completed in 2007 to complete links between all motorways and improve access to Grafton Gully and the Ports of Auckland.
- Victoria Park Tunnel. This 440 metre long tunnel carries three lanes of northbound traffic on the Northern Motorway heading towards the Auckland Harbour Bridge. The tunnel was completed in 2012, alleviating a major bottleneck on the Victoria Park viaduct.
- Newmarket Viaduct. This 700 metre long motorway viaduct carries the Southern Motorway over Newmarket. The original viaduct was opened in 1966 but was replaced with a completely new structure with higher earthquake standards and an extra southbound lane in 2012.
- Māngere Bridge. This bridge carries State Highway 20 over the Māngere Inlet of the Manukau Harbour. The opening of the Waterview Connection in July 2017 linked SH 20 to State Highway 16 (the North-Western Motorway), and completed the Western Ring Route. This increased the importance of this bridge and both state highways, and relieved pressure on the Auckland Harbour Bridge and the central motorway system by providing an alternative route for north–south traffic not bound for the city.

=== Future projects ===
Providing new roading connections in Auckland, or widening existing corridors, is becoming increasingly difficult and expensive. This means that most new roading projects are likely to be located in greenfield growth areas at the periphery of the Auckland urban area. Major roading projects currently planned or proposed include:

- East West Link. A proposed $1.85 billion four-lane highway linking State Highway 20 at Onehunga with State Highway 1 at Mount Wellington, primarily to reduce travel time for freight trucking. A change of government at the 2017 general election saw Labour and its coalition partners abandoning it, with other strategies being proposed to relieve pressure on the existing route.
- Second Harbour Crossing. A proposed tunnel between the city centre and the North Shore to complement the Auckland Harbour Bridge. This project has both a road and public transport component and is currently scheduled for construction in the late 2030s or early 2040s.

== Public transport ==
An AT bus in Auckland

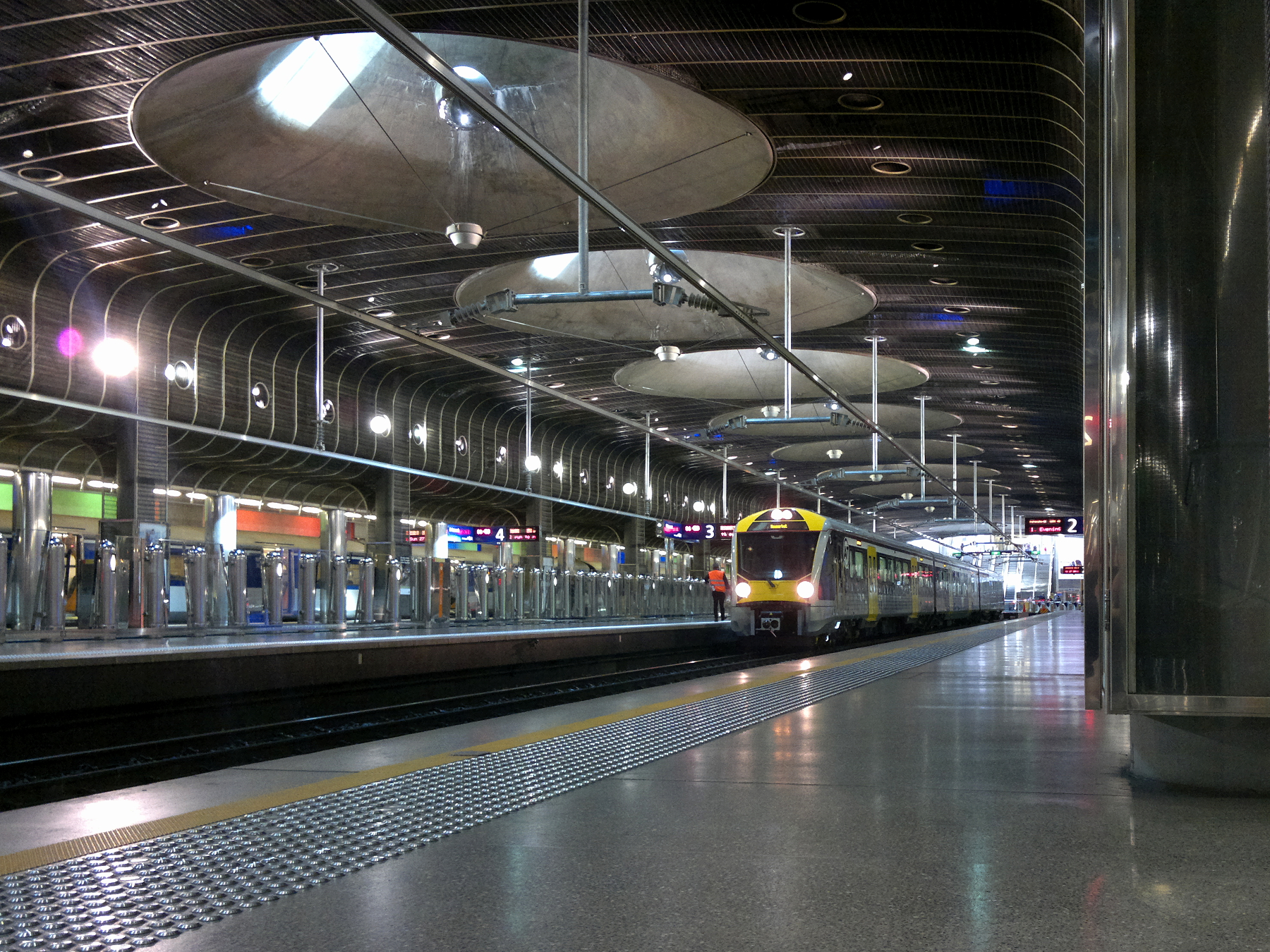
A train at Waitematā railway station

Public transport in Auckland consists of bus, ferry and commuter rail services. The hub of Auckland's public transport network is the Waitematā railway station near the Auckland waterfront, opened July 2003, where ferry, bus and train services meet.

=== Bus services ===
Bus services, the bulk of public transport in the city, are provided by privately owned bus companies contracted to Auckland Transport (AT) under the AT and AT Metro brands. The Northern Busway (opened in February 2008) provides bus rapid transit to Auckland's North Shore.

Frequent long-distance services, principally operated by Intercity and its subsidiary Newmans, link Auckland with all the main centres throughout the North Island.

=== Rail services ===
There are three railway lines in Auckland – the East West (E-W), Onehunga West (O-W), and South City (S-C) Lines. Urban rail services are operated by Auckland One Rail on behalf of AT under the AT brand. Since the early 2000s, there has been a substantial increase in services, with trains now operating every 10 minutes on the Western, Southern and Eastern lines at peak times.

Starting with the opening of Waitematā station in 2003, a series of investments has increased ridership to over 20 million annual boardings. These included double-tracking the Western Line, reopening the Onehunga Branch line, a programme of station upgrades and electrification of the entire Auckland suburban network between Swanson in the west and Papakura in the south. On 20 July 2015 the rollout of electric train services was completed.

In 2015–16, work started on the City Rail Link project, which will improve network capacity and significantly reduce travel times between Western Line stations and the city centre. The project consists of a 3.5 km (2.2 mi) long double-track rail tunnel underneath Auckland's city centre, between Britomart and Maungawhau (Mount Eden) railway stations. Test trains commenced on 13 February 2025. The City Rail Link opened for passenger travel on 13 September 2026.

Auckland has only one long-distance passenger service: the Northern Explorer, operated by KiwiRail under the brand name The Great Journeys of New Zealand. A service operates three times per week in each direction between Auckland and Wellington.

=== Ferry services ===
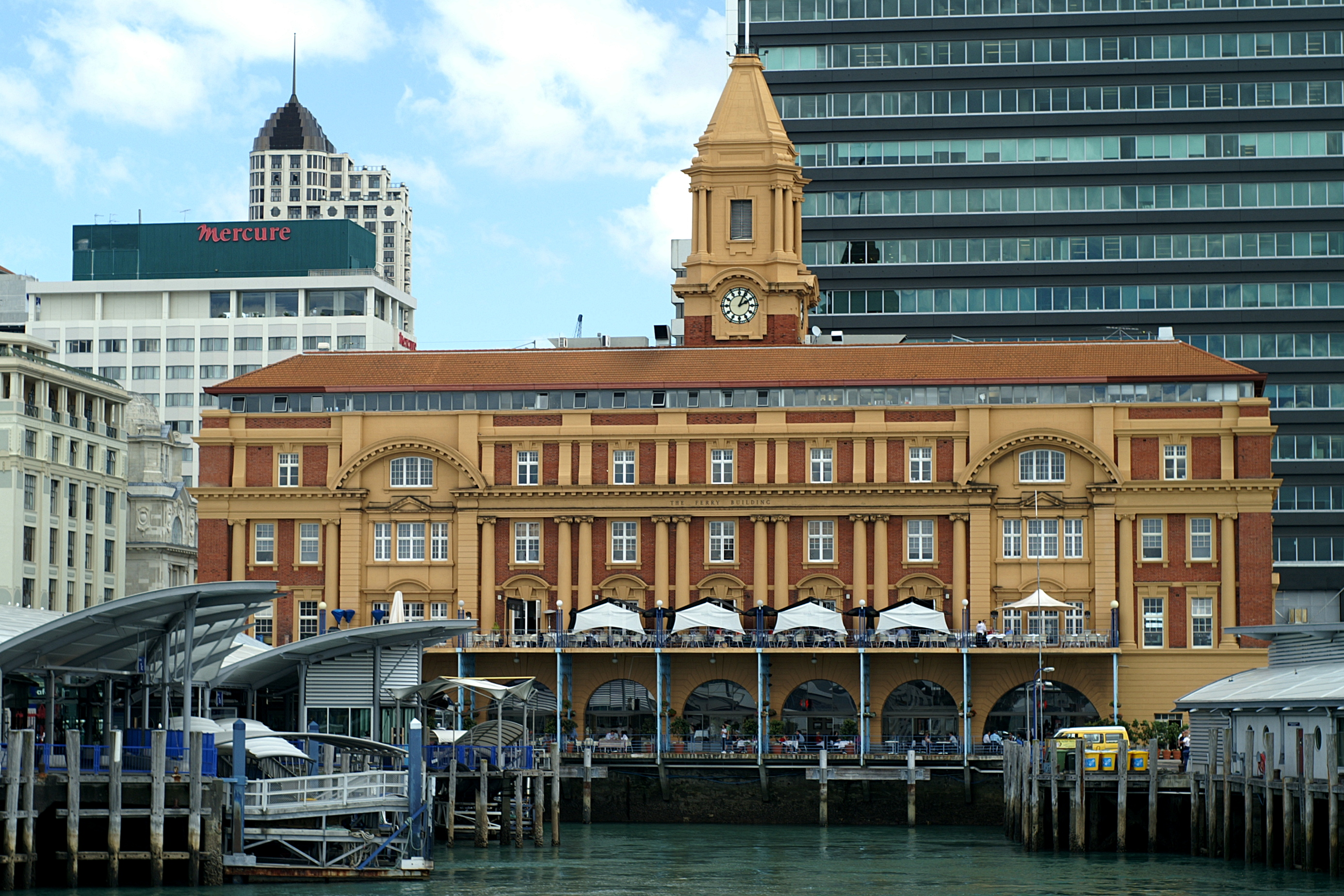
Auckland Ferry Terminal, 2006

A number of North Shore commuters who work in the Auckland CBD catch ferry services from Devonport, Stanley Bay, Bayswater, Beach Haven or Birkenhead. Services also connect the city with Waiheke Island, Gulf Harbour and Half Moon Bay. Ferries to Great Barrier Island are less regular, with services every 1–2 days, depending on the time of the year and the weather. Rangitoto, Motuihe Island and Tiritiri Matangi Island and the Coromandel have services usually focused on weekend and tourist trips.

== Sea transport ==
=== Commercial shipping ===
The Ports of Auckland, located on the Waitematā Harbour in Auckland's city centre, is New Zealand's largest and busiest container port. The 55 hectares of wharves and storage areas (mostly for containers, cars and other large shipments) are almost exclusively situated on reclaimed land, mostly in the former Commercial Bay, Official Bay and in Mechanics Bay. The main port facilities are:

- Ferguson container terminal
- Bledisloe multi-purpose terminal
- Multi-cargo facilities on Captain Cook, Marsden, Jellicoe, Wynyard and Freyberg wharves

In 2010 the Ports of Auckland contributed around $250 million per year to the Auckland economy. A 2015 Port Future Study highlighted that in the longer-term future the port will either need to expand in its current location or move to a different location, most likely either in the Manukau Harbour or the Firth of Thames.

=== Cruise ships ===
Auckland is an increasingly popular cruise ship port, with both Queens Wharf and Princes Wharf regularly being used as cruise ship terminals, especially during summer months. Over 100 cruise ships annually visit Auckland.

== Air transport ==
With Auckland being the largest city of New Zealand, a great number of international and national flight connections exist. Main routes are to Australia, Singapore, Hong Kong, Japan, and to the US West Coast. Within New Zealand, the main connections are to the capital in Wellington and to the main city of the South Island, Christchurch. However, smaller planes fly to almost all other cities and to many small airports all over New Zealand.

Historically, Auckland had first been served by flying boat services from Mechanics Bay and Hobsonville. As aircraft such as the Short Solent and Short Sunderland were replaced by land-based planes, the first airport was opened at Māngere, supplanting earlier airfields at Ardmore and Whenuapai.

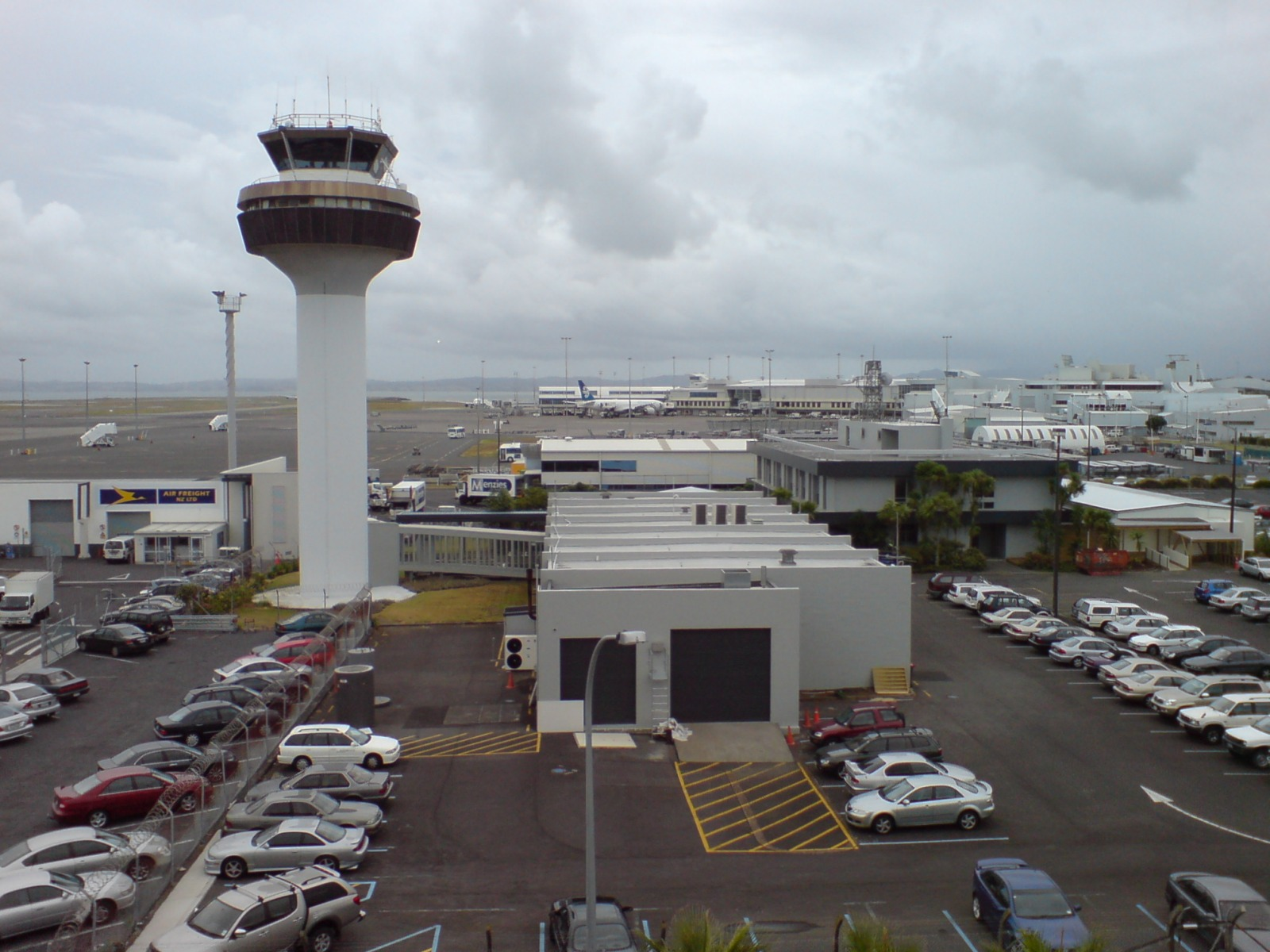
Auckland Airport

=== Airports ===
Auckland Airport, New Zealand's largest airport, lies beside Manukau Harbour, in the southern suburb of Māngere. It is a major base for Air New Zealand. A new runway is planned north of the main airport area, with a shorter length well suitable for the booming intra-New Zealand flight market.

There were proposals in the 2000–2007 period to redevelop the airport at Whenuapai, an RNZAF airbase in Waitakere, to the northwest of the Auckland conurbation. The proposals became a political issue, partly resolved by the election of an anti-airport mayor in North Shore City, and finally resolved by the amalgamation of all Auckland councils into Auckland Council in 2010. The proposals had also been opposed by the government.

Most private flights and light aircraft operate from the three smaller General Aviation (GA) airfields at the edges of the Auckland conurbation; Ardmore Airport south of the city which is NZ's busiest airfield in terms of movements, North Shore Aerodrome to the north and Parakai Airfield to the north west.

Mechanics Bay near the city centre, was the first international airport, and was used for many years as a base for flying boats of TEAL and amphibians of Tourist Air Travel and Sea Bee Air. The area now holds a heliport and the Auckland Marine Rescue Centre.

A Royal New Zealand Air Force facility at Hobsonville has been vacated and is currently under redevelopment primarily as a residential area, although some light commercial and industrial uses (for example super-yacht building) are present.

== Walking and cycling ==
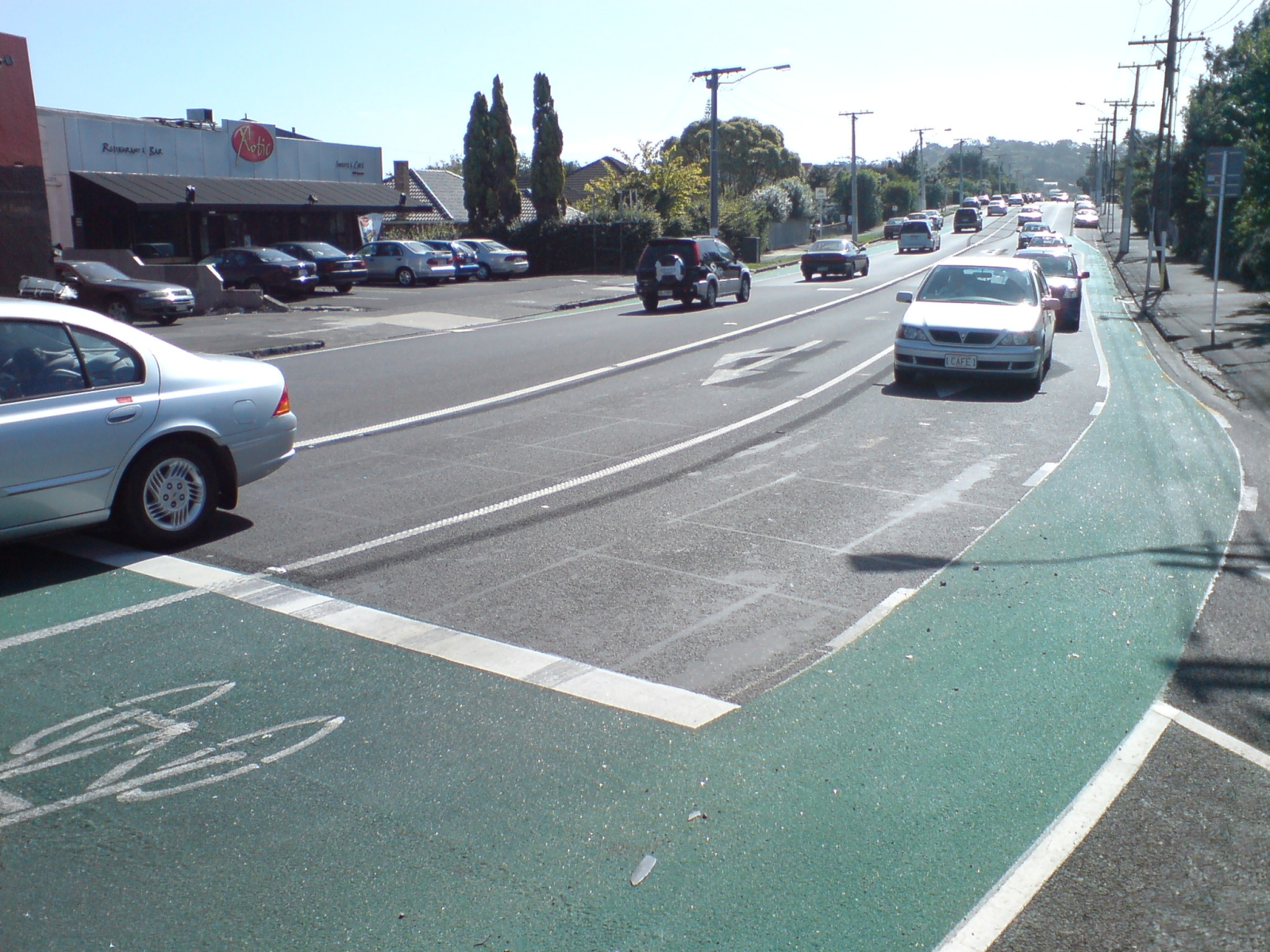
Typical example of pre-2015 on-street cycle lane. Mt Albert Road.

=== Cycling ===
Increased funding for cycling from the New Zealand Government and Auckland Council in the mid-2010s led to the development of higher quality cycling infrastructure in Auckland, including the Grafton Gully cycleway, the Quay Street cycleway and Te Ara I Whiti (the Lightpath) between 2015 and 2017. Overall, 52 kilometres of new cycleways is planned to be delivered between 2015 and 2018.

These improvements have already led to growth in the uptake of cycling. The northwest cycleway, which links with a number of projects delivered in recent years, saw its usage increase by 44% as a result of these improvements. Auckland Transport (AT) and the New Zealand Transport Agency have developed a ten-year investment programme for cycling in Auckland that focuses on rolling out high quality cycling infrastructure to different parts of the city. AT partners with community organisations to operate 10 'Bike Hubs' in the city to repair, refurbish and sell bikes as well as provide advice and information.

=== Walking ===
All travel begins and ends with a walking trip, even though a relatively small proportion of "journeys to work" are made primarily by walking or jogging. At the 2013 census 4.5% of Aucklanders walked or jogged to work, up from 3.9% in 2001.

Efforts are being made to improve the attractiveness of walking. A number of shared space projects were planned in several streets in the Auckland CBD. These upgrades aimed to improve the ability of pedestrians, cyclists and (slow-speed) motor vehicles to share the same transport spaces. Elliott Street, Darby Street, Lorne Street, Fort Street, Jean Batten Place, and Fort Lane have been converted into shared spaces since 2011. The portion of Federal Street between Wellesley Street West and Victoria Street West has also been made into a shared space. AT promotes 'Walking School Buses' to encourage children to walk to and from school in groups under adult supervision.

== See also ==
- Auckland Airport
- Ports of Auckland
- Public transport in Auckland
- Transport in New Zealand
