= Harbour Crossing =

Harbour Crossing or Harbor Crossing may refer to:

- Eastern Harbour Crossing, Hong Kong
- Western Harbour Crossing, Hong Kong
- Auckland Harbour Crossing Swim, New Zealand
- Manukau Harbour Crossing, New Zealand
- Second Harbour Crossing, Auckland, New Zealand

== See also ==
- Harbour Bridge (disambiguation)
- Harbour Tunnel (disambiguation)
- Second Harbour Crossing (disambiguation)
- Vehicular harbour crossings in Hong Kong
- Victoria Harbour crossings
