= Auckland Transport (disambiguation) =

Auckland Transport may refer to:

- Auckland Transport, the local government entity dealing with transport matters in Auckland, New Zealand
- Auckland Regional Transport Authority, the predecessor of Auckland Transport
- Transport in Auckland, New Zealand
