= Ring Route =

Ring Route may refer to:

- A ring road or beltway
- Ring Route (Nagoya Expressway)
- City Ring Route, Adelaide
- Western Ring Route
