= 1984 New Zealand bravery awards =

The 1984 New Zealand bravery awards were announced via a Special Honours List on 13 December 1984, and recognised ten people for acts of bravery between 1982 and 1984.

== Queen's Commendation for Brave Conduct ==
- Jape Sargent Wanoa – traffic officer, Ministry of Transport, Dunedin.

On 31 October 1982 a man making his maiden parachute jump over Momona Airport was blown off course and landed in the Taieri River. The river was in high flood, full of debris, discoloured, extremely cold and flowing swiftly. Mr Wanoa, then on annual leave, arrived at the scene shortly after the accident and with complete disregard for his own safety entered the river and for over 35 minutes endeavoured to locate the parachutist, whose body was recovered 7 days later.

- Bruce John McMillan – fireman, Feilding Volunteer Fire Brigade, New Zealand Fire Service.

For services on 29 November 1982 when he saved the life of an elderly woman at a railway level crossing by removing her from the tracks seconds before an approaching train passed. His prompt action saved the woman's life while placing his own at risk.

- Ronald MacGregor Renz – inspector, New Zealand Police, Auckland.
- Jeffrey Gary Gerbich – traffic sergeant, Auckland City Council.
- Christopher John England – traffic officer, Auckland City Council.

For services on 30 July 1983 when, at considerable personal risk to themselves, they saved the life of a driver of a motor vehicle which had crashed and caught fire. After some difficulty they managed to remove the unconscious driver from behind the wheel shortly before an explosion and the vehicle being engulfed in flames.

- Private Michael John Thomas Tristram – Royal New Zealand Infantry Regiment.
- Private David Thomas Upton – Royal New Zealand Infantry Regiment.

For service on 19 February 1984 when patrolling with their section along a river bank in West Malaysia they rescued a fellow soldier who had accidentally stepped into a water-hole and disappeared. It was the wet season, the river was flooded 1.5 metres above its normal level, was dirty and flowing swiftly. The soldier surfaced some 20 metres downstream and was then dragged under a further 20 metres by the weight of his rifle and pack. Had it not been for Private Tristram and Private Upton's prompt action and disregard for their own safety, the soldier would have drowned.

- Robert Wayne Thompson – traffic sergeant, Auckland Motorways, Ministry of Transport, Auckland.

For services in 1983 when he prevented a woman from jumping from the Newmarket Viaduct; in early 1984 for stopping a man from jumping from the Auckland Harbour Bridge, and in particular, on the evening of 4 June 1984, when after a violent struggle he secured a man who intended to jump from the Auckland Harbour Bridge.

- David Albert Sullivan – of Auckland.

For services on 23 June 1984 when he single-handedly pulled 2 people from a motor vehicle which had collided with another vehicle, spun around, rolled over on its right side and burst into flames. Heat and flames prevented him from rescuing a third person, an 82-year-old passenger. Bystanders did not attempt to assist in rescuing the trapped people.

- Robert Edgar Brocas – traffic officer, Ministry of Transport, Meremere.

For services on the evening of 22 August 1984 when he was instrumental in saving the life of a driver from drowning by pulling him from a motor vehicle which was upside down and gradually becoming submerged in a swamp.
