= Harbour Bridge =

Harbour Bridge or Harbor Bridge may refer to:

== Australia ==
- Sydney Harbour Bridge, New South Wales

== Canada ==
- Halifax Harbour Bridges, a Crown corporation, Nova Scotia
- Saint John Harbour Bridge, Saint John, New Brunswick

== New Zealand ==
- Auckland Harbour Bridge, Auckland
- Onehunga Harbour Road Bridge, Auckland
- Tauranga Harbour Bridge, Tauranga
- Upper Harbour Bridge, Auckland

== Slovakia ==
- Prístavný most (literally Harbour Bridge), Bratislava

== Taiwan ==
- Great Harbor Bridge, Kaohsiung

== Ukraine ==
- Harbour Bridge (Kyiv)

== United Kingdom ==
- Wick Harbour Bridge, Wick, Scotland

== United States ==
- Corpus Christi Harbor Bridge, Texas
  - Harbor Bridge Project (New Harbor Bridge) replacement
- Great Egg Harbor Bridge, New Jersey

== See also ==
- Harbour Crossing (disambiguation)
- Harbour Tunnel (disambiguation)
