= Second Harbour Crossing, Auckland =

Proposed transport link in Auckland

Coordinates: 36.830722°S 174.748793°E

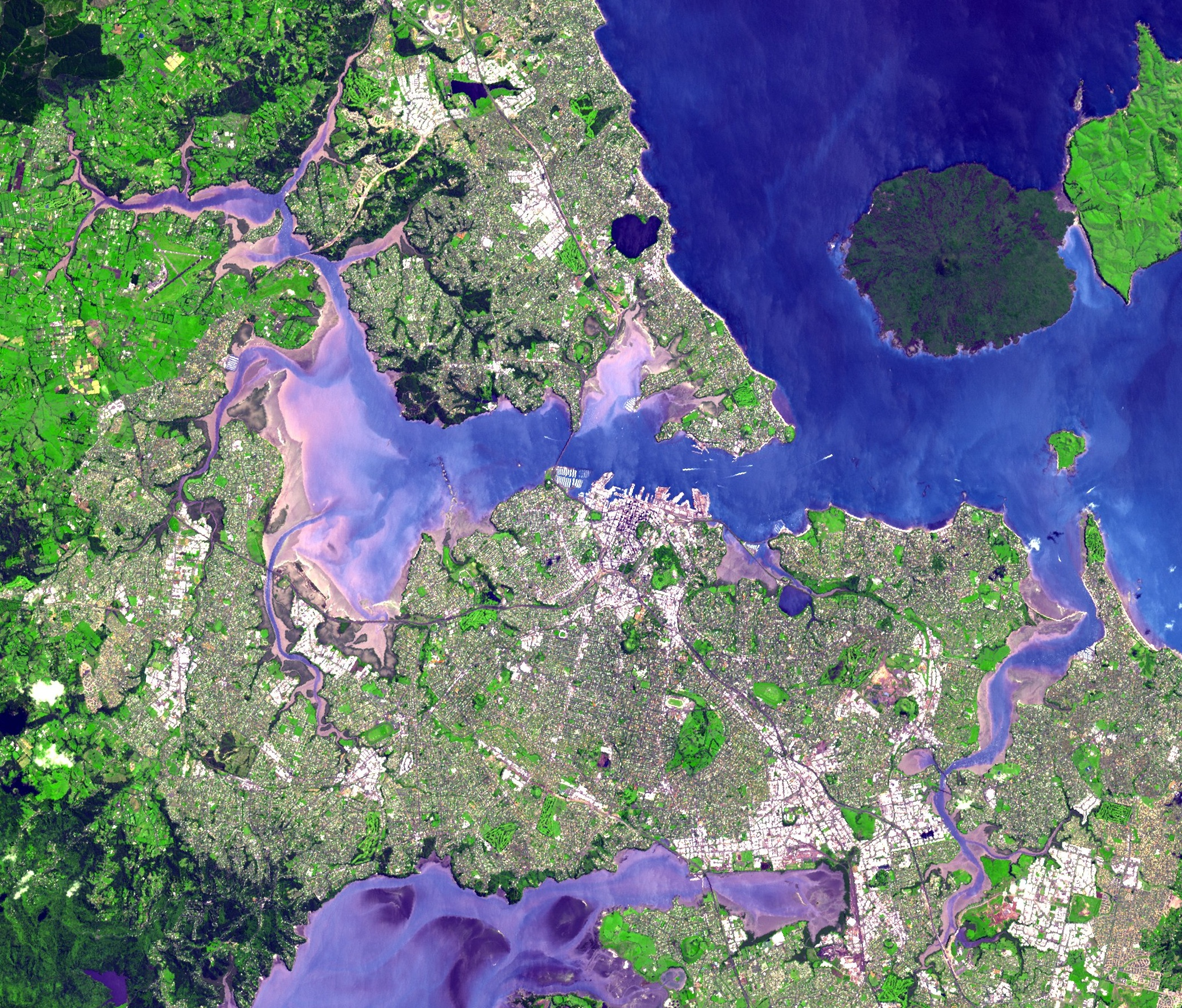
Satellite view of Auckland, with Waitematā Harbour separating the North Shore from the rest of the city. The existing Auckland Harbour Bridge is near the centre of the image.

The Second Harbour Crossing is the name given to the proposed second transport link across the Waitematā Harbour in Auckland, New Zealand. Planners have also referred to new links across the harbour as the Additional Waitematā Harbour Crossing (AWHC) or the Waitematā Harbour Connections (WHC).

Roughly a third of New Zealand's population live in the Auckland Region, and the harbour bisects the city between its CBD and the North Shore. The current Auckland Harbour Bridge, built in 1959, was widened significantly in 1969 but has long been at capacity during peak hours. Carrying both national north–south and local traffic, it is a significant choke point in New Zealand's road network. The alternative motorway route around the edge of the harbour is also near peak capacity despite widening programs, and is easily gridlocked if the bridge is closed due to an accident or adverse weather conditions. The current crossing's limitations are a major contributor to Auckland's wider traffic congestion issues and their accompanying economic impacts.

New crossings have been proposed repeatedly over the previous decades. Most recently, in 2023 the Labour government of Chris Hipkins announced plans for a new crossing—involving two new road tunnels and a single light rail tunnel—to begin construction in 2029. However, with Labour's loss in the 2023 General Election these proposals are under review by the new National-led government of Prime Minister Christopher Luxon.

== Background ==
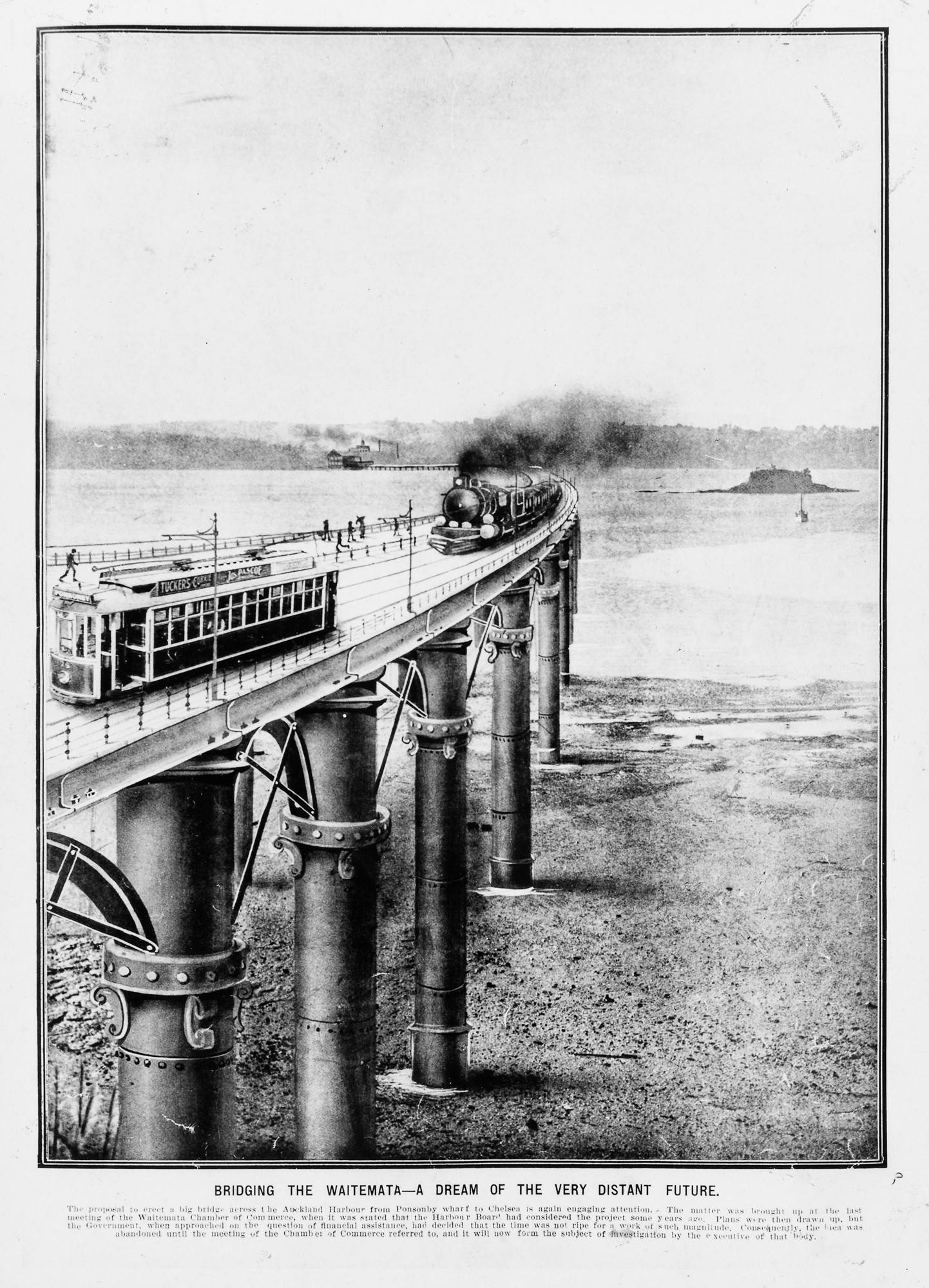
"Bridging the Waitemata - a dream of the very distant future" (1911 illustration, unbuilt)

Proposals for a crossing over Waitematā Harbour first arose only a few decades after Auckland was founded by the British in 1840. In 1860, John Bell designed a drawbridge on floating pontoons that would have given cattle and pig farmers in the rural North Shore a more direct route for driving their livestock into the city. While the plan included tolls to pay for its construction, its estimated cost (£16,000) was considered too high. Further bridges were proposed in 1927 and 1929, while the earliest tunnel proposal—floated during discussions about extending the city's rail network—dates to 1920.

A Royal Commission in 1946 recommended a four-lane road bridge, but further modelling predicted that there would be a population boom in the North Shore after being connected to the CBD, necessitating at least six lanes for future-proofing. The Auckland Harbour Authority was established in 1951 to lobby for funding, seek tenders from architects and construction firms, and further develop the plans, which had now settled on a compromise five-lane bridge with two additional walking and cycling lanes. However, the National government, led by Prime Minister Sidney Holland, insisted that the total budget could not exceed $5 million. This led to a so-called "austerity" design of a four-lane bridge without pedestrian/cycling lanes at all. Construction began on the Auckland Harbour Bridge in 1954, and it opened in 1959, with toll booths in place until 1984.

Traffic was immediately higher than expected from its first day of opening. By 1969 it had become obvious that the bridge was too narrow and two additional lanes—known locally as the "Nippon clip-ons"—were added on each side, creating an eight-lane bridge. At the time, it was predicted that the increased capacity would last only until about 1985. Even with the clip-on sections and new traffic management in place, the Harbour Bridge was soon experiencing congestion during rush hours again. Proposals for a second bridge soon started to be discussed, such as one connecting from Meola Reef to Birkenhead, though the idea was abandoned in the 1970s after public outcry.

Studies into traffic patterns across the Auckland region consistently predicted that congestion would continue to get worse as the North Shore grew further and Auckland City became more densely settled, and pressure for another harbour crossing has grown in tandem with the city's growth in population. New Zealand also experiences regular earthquakes and volcanic eruptions, and having only one crossing, which could be disabled during a natural disaster, has been identified as an issue of national concern. However, the substantial cost of any new crossing, as well as the disruption to communities on both sides of the harbour during construction—the North Shore is now a densely populated urban district, unlike when the original bridge was built—has repeatedly dissuaded governments from investing in any specific plan.

Instead, planners have tended to focus on shorter-term solutions which mitigate the urgency for a new crossing. For example, Auckland Council's 2011 ten-year transit plan review explicitly argued that transit proposals which avoid the need for a second harbour crossing altogether, or at the very least delay its necessity, should be prioritised. The most notable of these projects, the Western Ring Route—a combination of upgraded and new motorway sections skirting the western edge of the harbour and suburbs, to provide relief for traffic travelling between the North Shore and West Auckland—was completed in July 2017 with the opening of the Waterview Connection.

Opponents of any new crossing have also pointed to multiple traffic surveys which have found that the number of car trips across the existing bridge during peak times has remained relatively stable since the 1990s, as the feeder junctions and roads at either end of the bridge are also at capacity. New journeys have instead been made possible with investment in better public transport, and specifically bus routes—since the construction of the hugely successful Northern Busway, 50% of peak time passengers across the bridge are now carried by bus.

However, there are few further options for continuing to increase cross-harbour capacity without an entirely new bridge or tunnel. In 2017, Auckland Transport's projections indicated that the Northern Busway would reach maximum capacity in 2026, twenty years earlier than originally expected, and there would soon be overcrowding at Albany, Sunnynook and Akoranga stations. The only option for increasing capacity further on the route is for it to be converted into a light rail line, but with the existing bridge at its weight limit this will be impossible until a second crossing is built to carry the line across to the CBD. The number of trucks making north–south journeys across the bridge is also predicted to more than double by mid-century, further emphasising the impact of congestion on the bridge to New Zealand's wider economy.

The failure to provide pedestrian or cycle lanes on the original bridge has also meant that there is no foot route across the harbour. While Auckland Transport has long provided a number of ferry routes for passengers travelling from areas of the North Shore to the central Downtown Ferry Terminal near Waitematā Station in the CBD, the inconvenience of the ferries in terms of both time and expense has long been seen as dissuading many Aucklanders from switching to active modes of travel, which would further help ease road congestion. Auckland Transport's Transport Emissions Reduction Pathway, published in August 2022, reaffirmed that a new fixed crossing with pedestrian and cycling lanes is seen as an essential part of its longer-term plans.

== Modern proposals ==
=== 1996 report ===
Following a detailed scoping study undertaken in 1996, Transit New Zealand identified its preferred options for a new crossing – either a new bridge approximately 500m west of the bridge connecting to the North-Western Motorway (SH16) via a tunnel underneath Ponsonby and Grey Lynn, or a tunnel slightly to the east of the bridge connecting to the Central Motorway Junction via twin cut-and-cover tunnels under the western CBD / Victoria Park. A follow-up study in 2003 found that these proposals, if both built together, would cost the equivalent of $4.5 billion in 2022 dollars.

=== 2006-2009 alignment studies ===
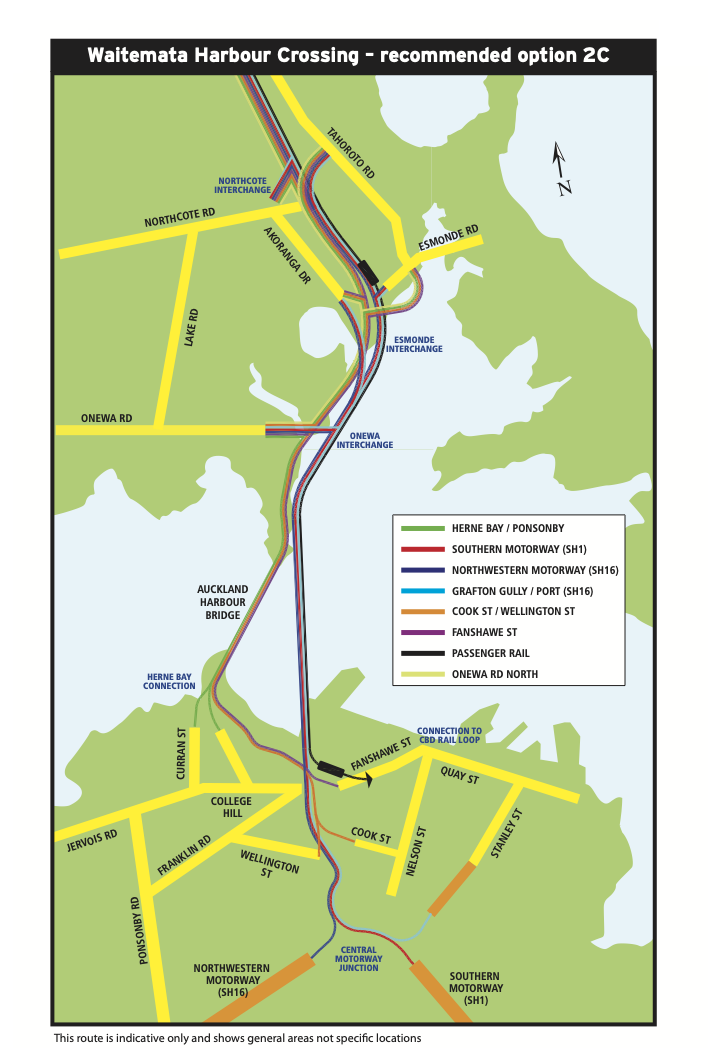
A map of NZTA's preferred route ("Option 2C") for two new harbour crossings, published in 2008

In 2006, Transit New Zealand consulted on a new 10-year plan, and included funding for another study into a second harbour road crossing. This included the possibility of landing a future tunnel underneath the Western Reclamation (now known as the Wynyard Quarter), with a connecting tunnel to south of Victoria Park. Costs were estimated at NZ$3 billion. A possible tunnel between Mechanics Bay and Northcote was also considered in the feasibility studies, but faced increasing criticism from local groups, and was seen as problematic due to the denser residential zones and geographic difficulties faced on such an alignment.

In December 2007, Transit New Zealand noted that more than 160 options had been narrowed down, and the final option—known as "option 2C"—was published in early 2008. It consisted of two new crossings, made of two tunnels each. The first possible alignment (approximately 4.5 km) would be a parallel link several hundred metres directly to the east of the existing bridge, while the second alignment (approximately 6.5 km) would start in the same general environs in the North Shore, but travel diagonally southeastwards to link up with the motorway at Grafton Gully, east of the Auckland CBD. The second option, due to the need to cross shipping lanes, would need to be a tunnel. It would also have possibly connected to the CBD via a side branch tunnel, for use by public transport only.

There were a number of reactions from local community and lobbying groups to the consultation. North Shore City noted that it preferred a tunnel option for aesthetic reasons, and for the option to convert it to light rail at a future stage. Commentators like Brian Rudman noted that it would make the most sense to keep the new crossing for public transport only, possibly to connect with a rail tunnel to Britomart Transport Centre (now known as Waitematā Station). This statement was largely supported by North Shore mayor George Wood, who noted that public transport provision on any new crossing (including the possibility for light rail or heavy rail to connect to Waitematā Station) had been part of North Shore Council's plans for many years.

In mid-2008, the Waitematā Harbour Crossing study group—a private lobbying group representing local companies—released their recommended option, which would have connected from the existing Esmonde and Onewa motorway interchanges on the North Shore side to Auckland CBD, reaching land in the southwestern part of the Wynyard Quarter (though the links would have continued as tunnels for some further distance, likely going under Victoria Park). The option, selected from several hundred considered alignments, involved four separate tunnels, two for motor vehicles and two for public transport, the demolition of Victoria Park Viaduct, and a new rail station in the Wynyard Quarter. The total costs were estimated at between NZ$3.7 to NZ$4.1 billion, and their study predicted that it would increase the number of journeys across the harbour by 80% by 2041, with 30% by public transport.

In mid-2009, Waka Kotahi NZ Transport Agency (NZTA)—the successor to Transit New Zealand—safeguarded the route so that further redevelopment on the Wynyard Quarter would not negatively affect the future tunnel. On 2 December 2009, NZTA announced that designations would be protected for the four-tunnel option, though funding to build them was not allocated in upcoming budgets, and no future date for construction was announced.

=== 2007 "Anzac Centenary Bridge" alternative ===
During the public discussions in 2007, a group of local politicians and architects put forward a proposal to build a new, much larger bridge to the east of the existing bridge, and then demolish the latter. The new cantilever spar cable-stayed bridge, designed by the Jasmax architectural firm, would be built in time for the 100-year memorial of the Gallipoli landings in 1915.

The new bridge would be roughly 50% longer than the existing one and triple the capacity by including corridors for light rail, cyclists, and pedestrians as well as cars and buses. The designers argued that the new bridge would pay for itself by freeing up 35 hectares of land (and 3.3 km of shoreline) for redevelopment in some of the most sought-after Auckland locations, like Saint Mary's Bay, which were currently taken up by large motorway approaches. The proposed bridge would also be cheaper to operate, and unlike a tunnel, would not need emission vents.

In October 2009, the bridge option again surfaced with a group of backers suggesting that a bridge would be a better option from both urban design and transport planning perspectives. However, critics argued that the extra investment required to meet the tight 2015 deadline would necessitate taking funds away from other crucial transport initiatives in the region. The then-mayor of North Shore, Andrew Williams, and the then-chairman of the Auckland Regional Council, Mike Lee, both supported the earlier studies into a tunnel. The then-mayor of Auckland City, John Banks, also favoured the tunnel option, though he did not outright oppose the bridge idea, though the then-mayor of Manukau City, Len Brown, considered the bridge proposal worthy of consideration.

A more detailed concept for the bridge, published in late 2009, included eight traffic lanes (including separate truck and bus lanes) and two light rail tracks on a bridge deck alongside walking and cycling paths, possibly with travelators. Its designers claimed that the estimated NZ$2–3 billion cost of the bridge would be significantly cheaper than existing tunnel plans, estimated at NZ$4 billion.

In December 2009 NZTA announced that, though designations would be sought for new tunnel options, a future bridge was not being precluded so as to protect against conflict with future development in the Wynyard Quarter. The lobby group for the bridge regarded this as a success, though their original timeframe had been substantially pushed back with construction not planned to start until 2015. The centenary bridge planning group disbanded soon after, and there is now no organisation pursuing the bridge.

=== 2010 study ===
In March 2010, tendering for another second crossing study was announced by Minister of Transport Steven Joyce. The decision was criticised in an editorial in The New Zealand Herald for wasting time and money, since the previous study only a few years earlier had already, at cost of over $1 million, conclusively ruled in favour of new tunnels over any new bridges.

The eventual report made a business case for three new harbour crossings—a bridge, a road tunnel, and a heavy rail tunnel—for a total estimated cost of $6 billion. The new bridge would have included tolled bike lanes.

=== 2011 "Skypath" ===
To save waiting for an entirely new crossing, in 2011 NZTA proposed focusing on only part of the 2010 recommendations and adding new pedestrian and cycling paths onto the existing bridge. The plan initially had strong local support and was added to Auckland Transport's strategic priority list soon after, with resource consent sought and granted in 2016. The new Labour-led government elected in 2017 also pledged to fund the crossing.

However, concerns over the complexity of adding extra weight to the existing support columns led to the plan being revised in 2019, with Skypath instead proposed to run beneath the existing bridge on its own entirely independent set of columns. The plan was eventually cancelled altogether in 2021 after construction costs had grown to an estimated $785m, by which point planners argued that it would be more efficient to simply build an entirely new crossing altogether as originally planned. Local activists have continued to campaign for one of the existing bridge's lanes to be "liberated" for cycling, arguing that it would still provide a net increase to the bridge's capacity by encouraging commuters to switch away from cars. However, NZTA has repeatedly rejected requests for a trial lane after coming to the conclusion that collision risks to pedestrians and cyclists from passing traffic could not be mitigated.

=== 2023 Waitematā Harbour Connections proposals ===
In 2019, NZTA commissioned consultancy firm PwC to examine the business cases for and against a wide range of second crossing options, taking into account historical proposals and current economic and demographic trends. The authors noted that 170,000 vehicles were crossing the bridge each day, including 11,000 trucks and more than 1,000 buses. While car passengers during peak hours (7-9am on weekdays) had remained largely static over the previous 25 years due to feeder roads on either side of the bridge having reached capacity, the total number of bus and truck journeys per day continued to grow, with 26,000 truck crossings predicted by 2046. The authors argued that previous road-plus-rail proposals would be less efficient than new heavy rail tunnels for cargo and passenger services.

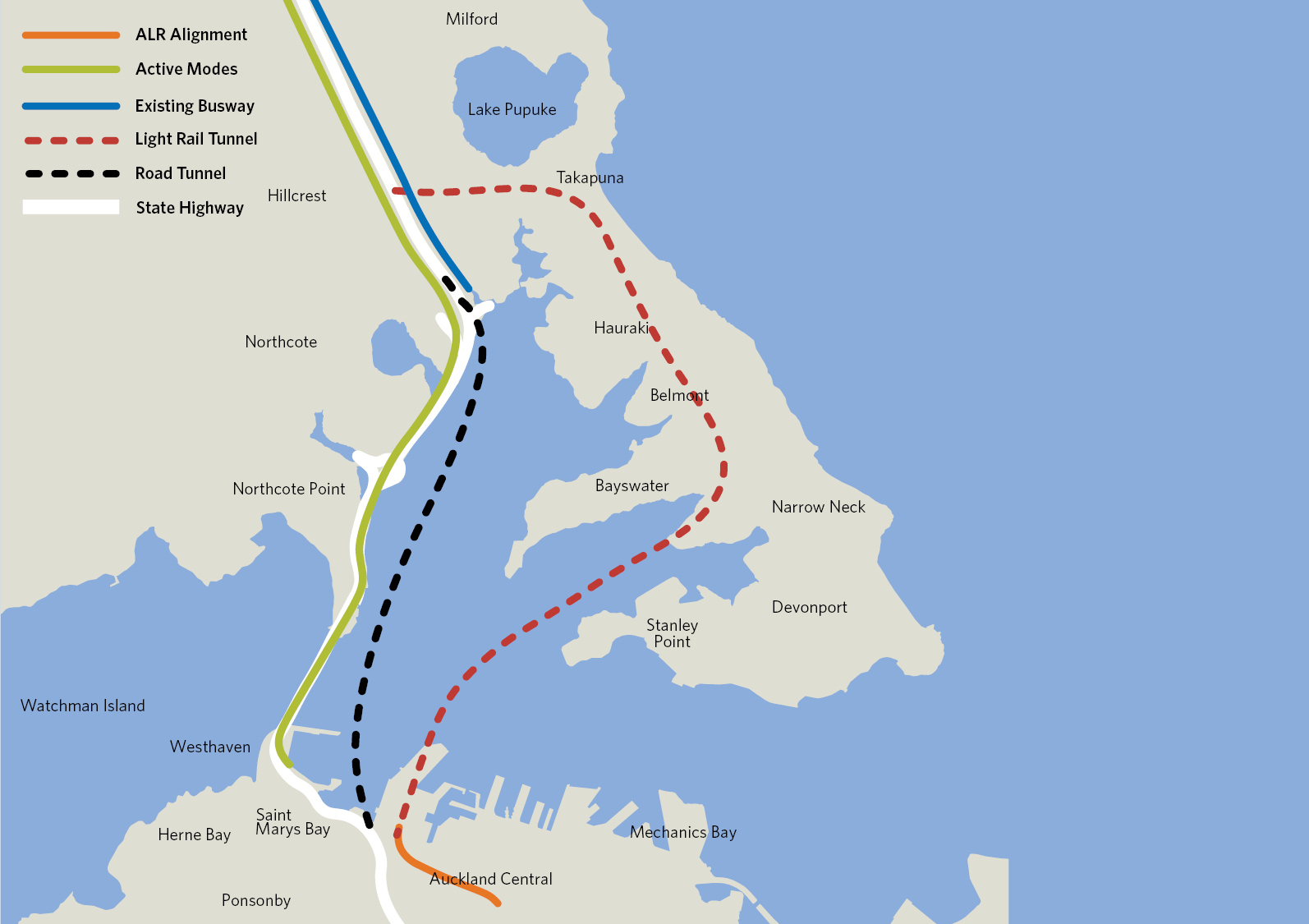
Option 1

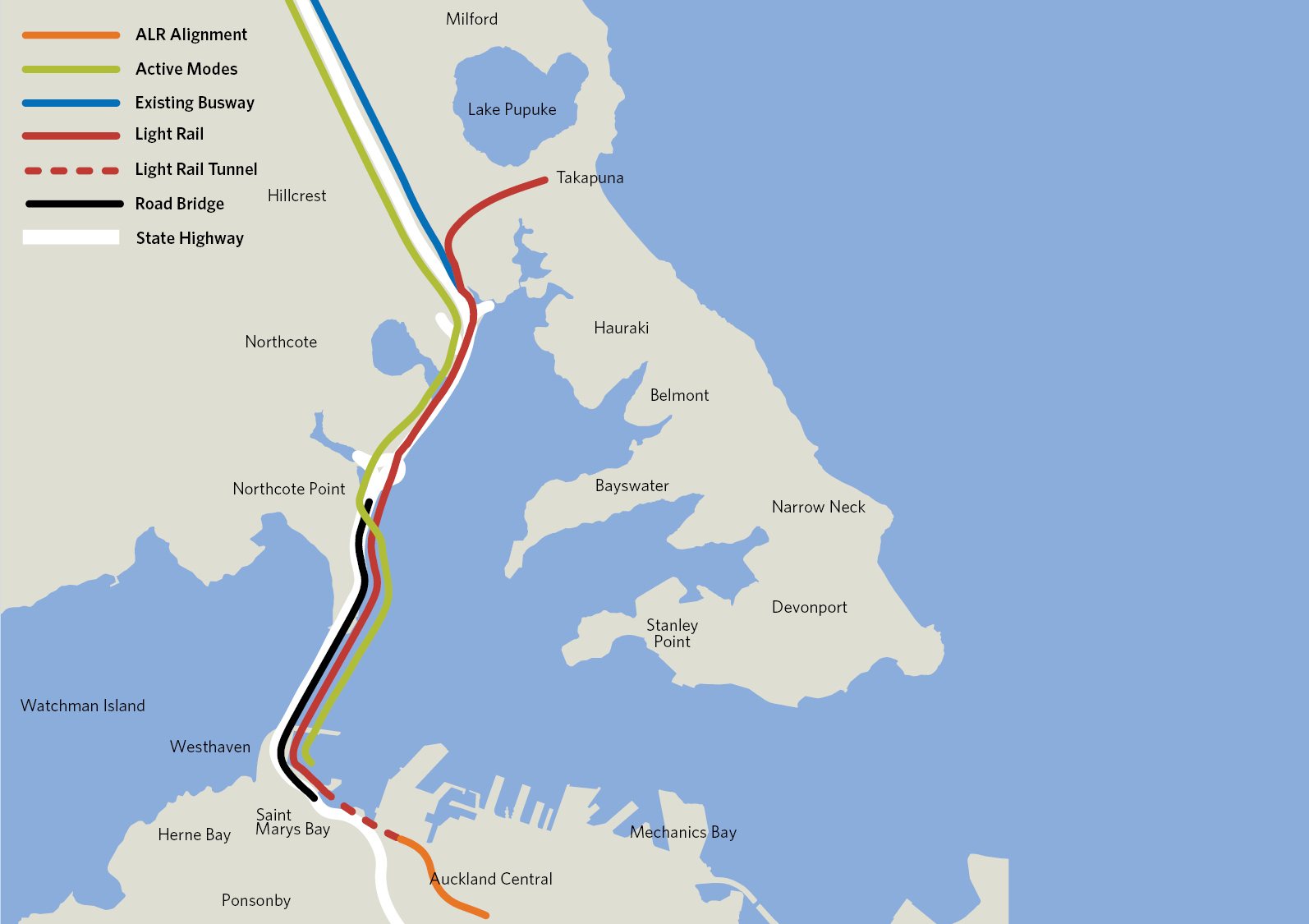
Option 2

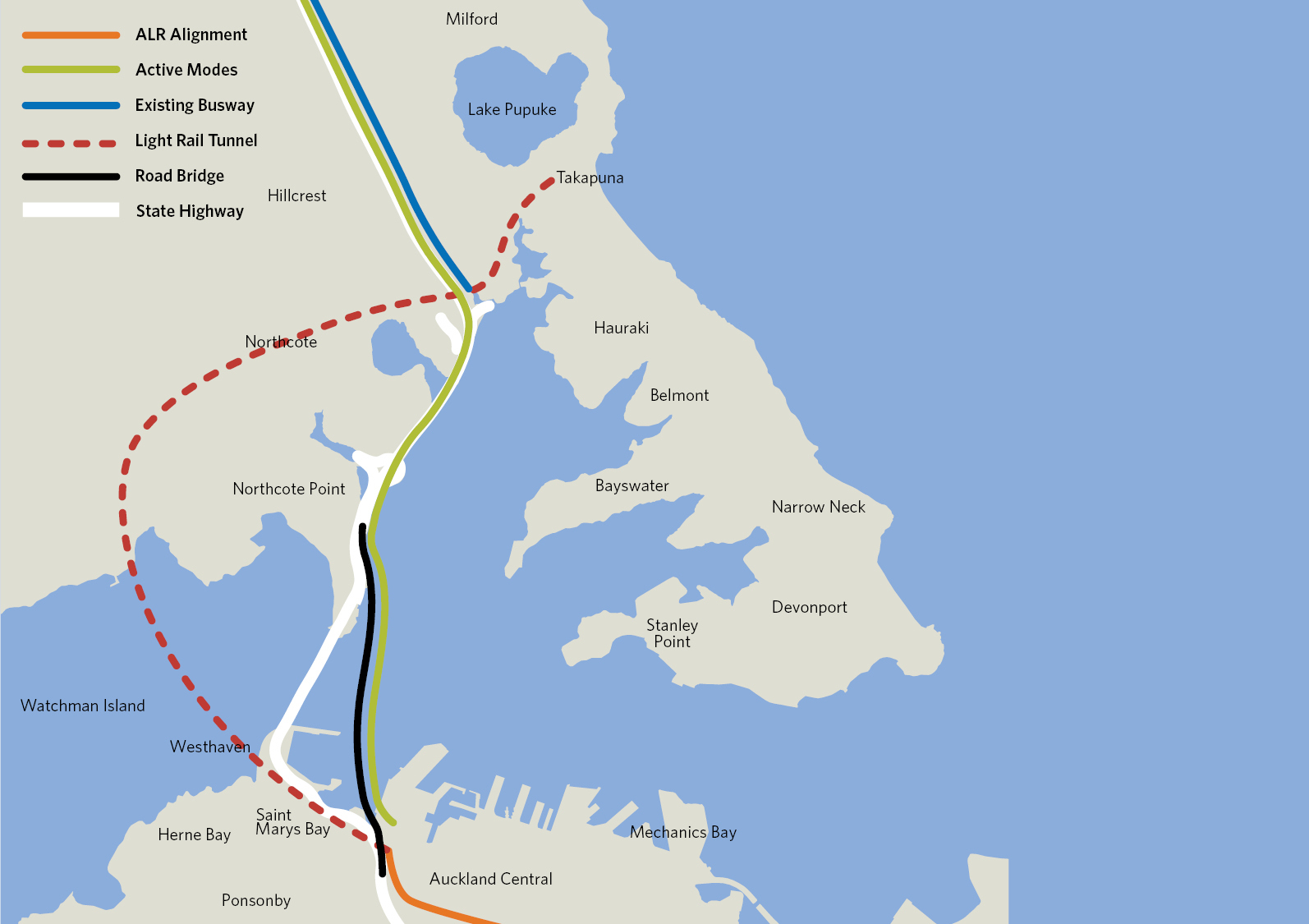
Option 3

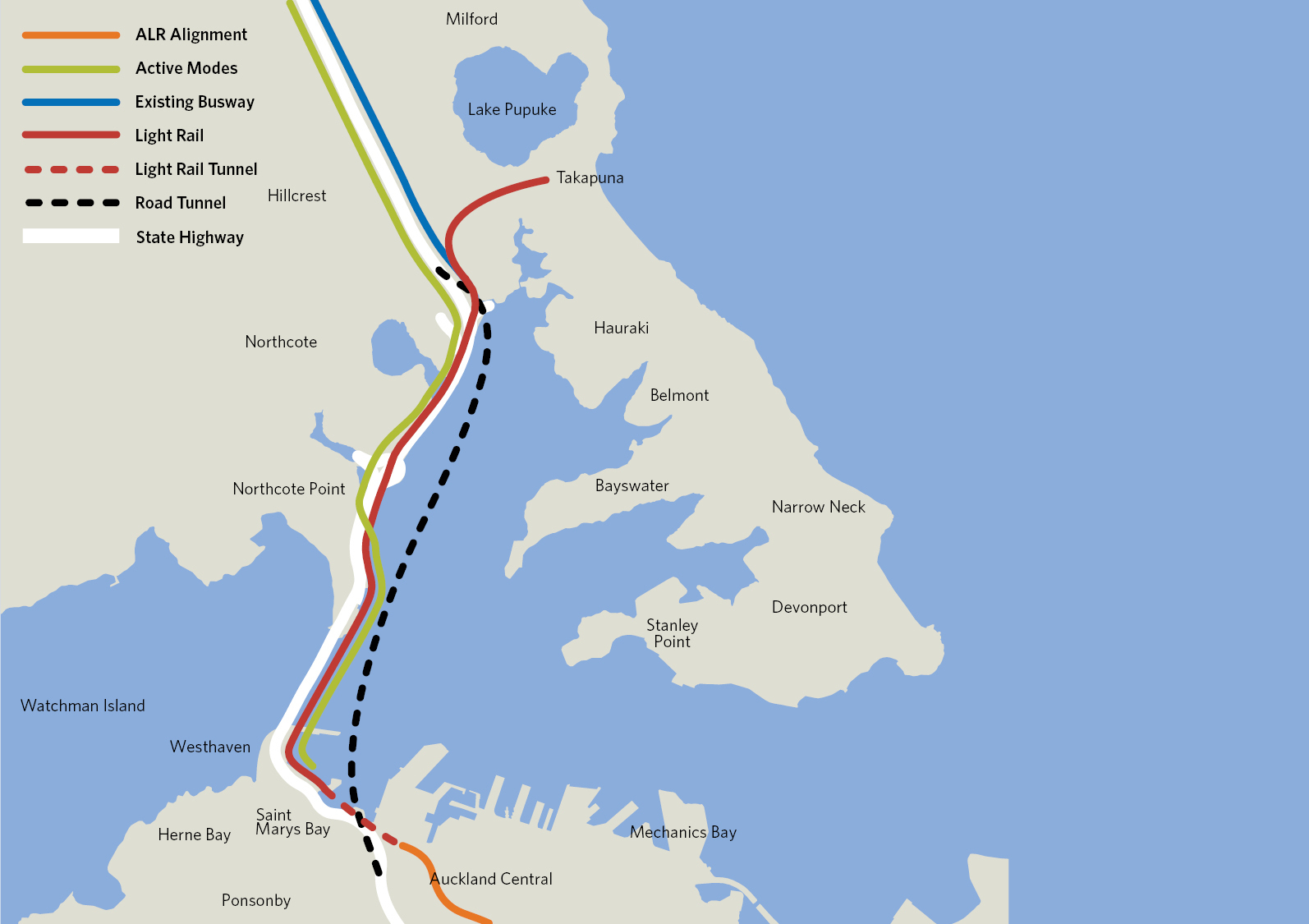
Option 4

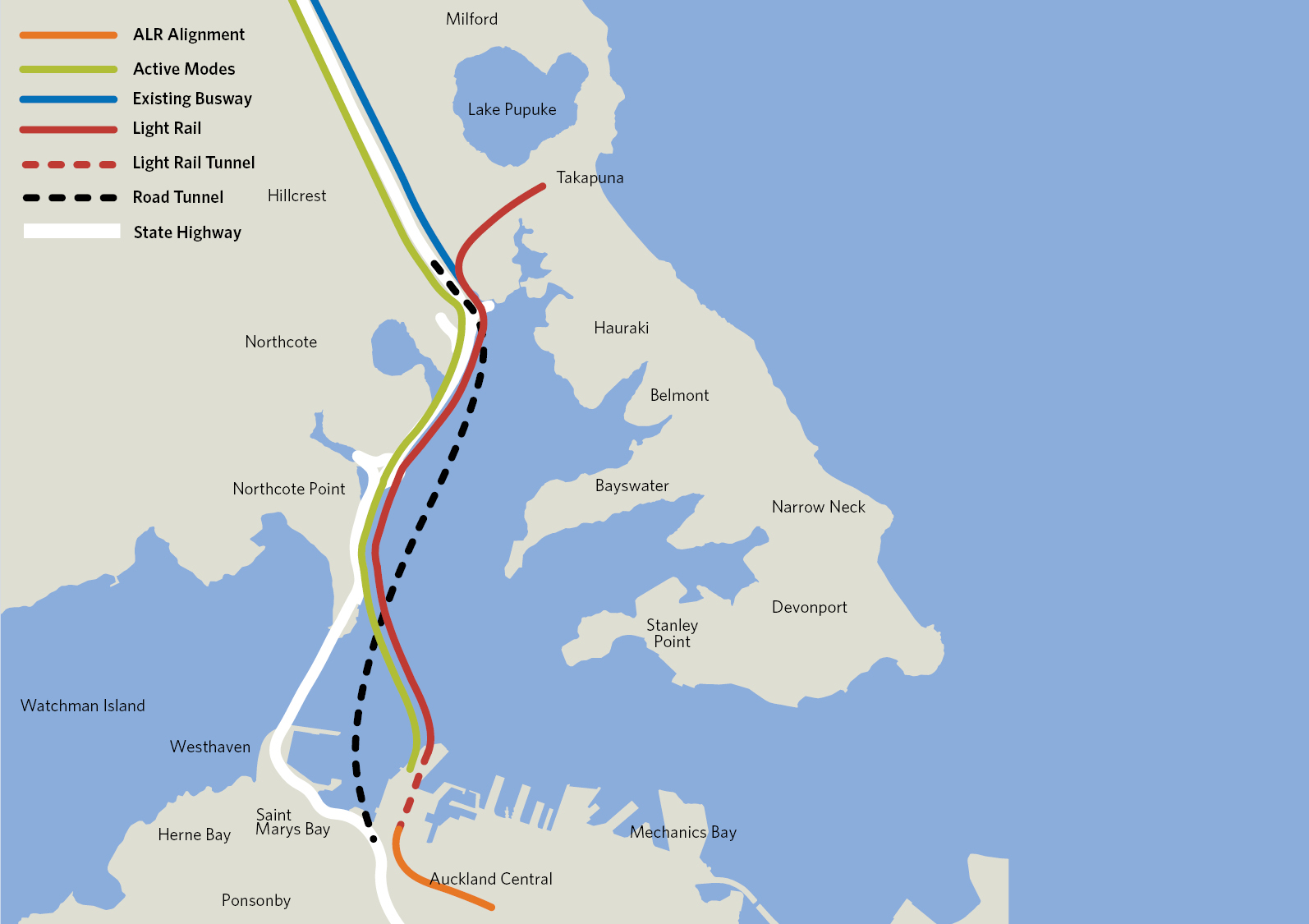
Option 5

In March 2023 Transport Minister Michael Wood announced a public consultation on five options for new "Waitematā Harbour Connections", informed by the findings of the 2019 review. The options varied in scale and cost, with a mixture of tunnels, bridges, and different modes of transport, though all were intended to integrate with the planned Auckland Light Rail route between Auckland Airport and the CBD, with a station in the Wynyard Quarter:

- Option 1: Two new tunnels. A light rail line from Wynyard Quarter to Smales Farm via Belmont and Takapuna, and a road tunnel forming a new section of Highway 1 from Saint Mary's Bay to Akoranga Drive. The existing bridge would be reconfigured with more bus lanes and new pedestrian/cycle lanes. Total cost estimated at $25 billion (the most expensive of the options), with a 15-year construction timetable.
- Option 2: One new bridge, adjacent to the existing one with a mixture of car, bus, and pedestrian/cycle lanes, as well as a light rail line connecting the Wynyard Quarter to Takapuna via Akoranga Station. Total cost estimated at $15 billion, with a 10-year construction timetable. Noted in the government's announcement as the cheapest option, but also the least-resilient.
- Option 3: One new bridge, one new tunnel. A new light rail line running through the tunnel from the Wynyard Quarter to Takapuna via Birkenhead, Northcote, and Akoranga stations. The new bridge would combine car and pedestrian/cycle lanes to connect Westhaven to Northcote Point for vehicles travelling through Auckland, while local traffic would be concentrated on the existing bridge. 10-year construction timetable, but noted in the government's announcement as the least-efficient option in terms of increasing total cross-harbour capacity.
- Option 4: One new bridge, one new tunnel. A new bridge east of the existing one, connecting St Mary's Bay at its southern end to Sulphur Beach at the north, to carry pedestrian/cycle lanes as well as a new light rail line. The rail line would connect the Wynyard Quarter with Takapuna via Akoranga Station. The new road tunnel would form part of Highway 1 connecting Saint Mary's Bay to Akoranga Drive. 15-year construction timetable, and considered joint-most-efficient in terms of capacity by the government along with option five.
- Option 5: Identical to option four, except for the southern end of the new bridge would be located at the Wynyard Quarter instead of St Mary's Bay. 15-year construction timetable, and considered joint-most-efficient in terms of capacity by the government along with option four.

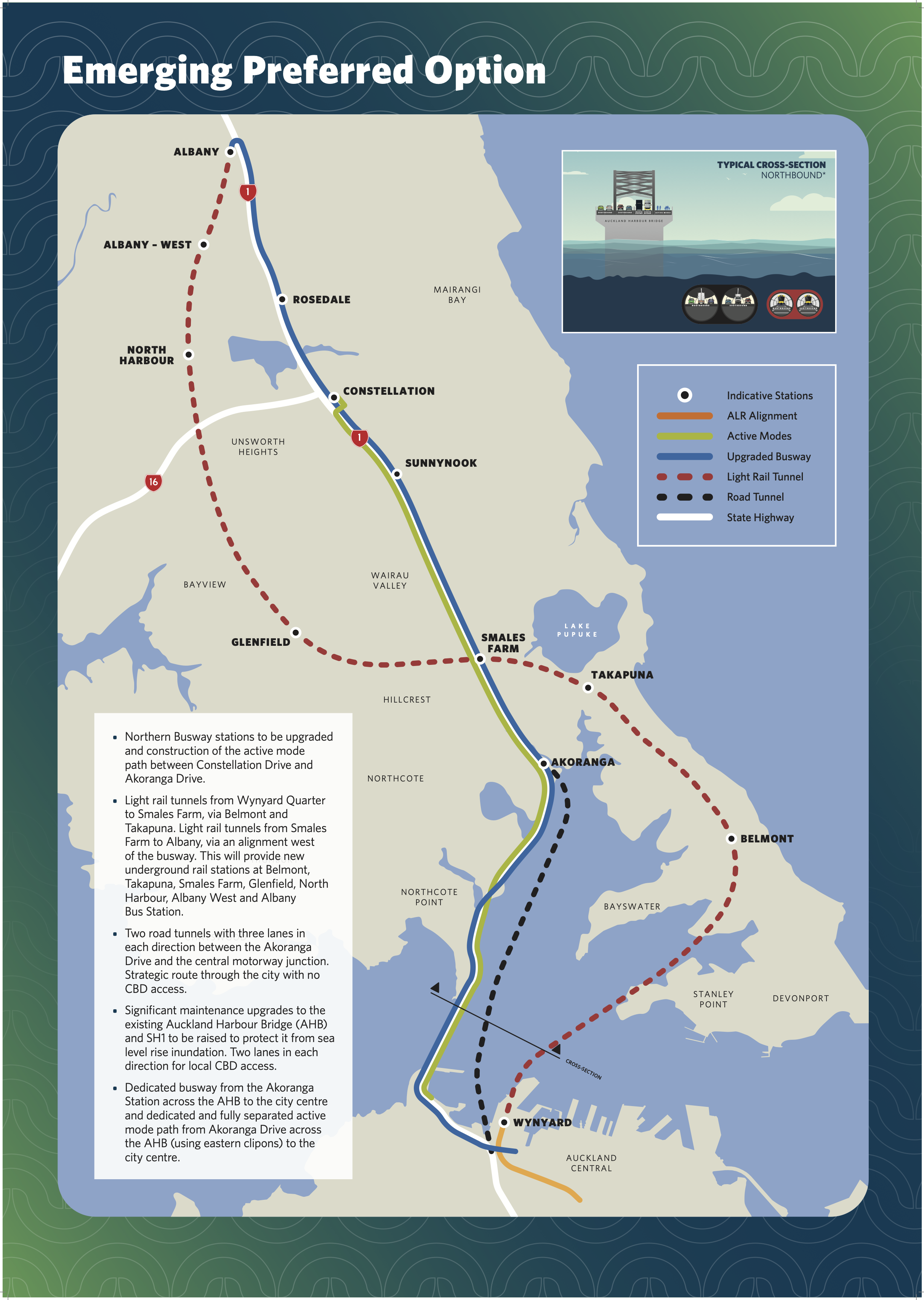
Map published by Waka Kotahi NZ Transport Agency detailing the "Emerging Preferred Option" on 6 August 2023

Work on the new crossing(s) was intended to begin in 2029. In August 2023, Transport Minister David Parker and Prime Minister Chris Hipkins announced that the consultation had led to a so-called "Emerging Preferred Option" which combined aspects from several of the earlier options:

- A tunnel for Auckland Light Rail, crossing from the Wynyard Quarter to Belmont on the North Shore before heading north via stations at Takapuna, Smales Farm Bus Station, Glenfield, North Harbour, Albany West and terminating at Albany Bus Station.
- Two new road tunnels (one for traffic in each direction) connecting the Central Motorway Junction directly to the North Shore, allowing national north–south through traffic to bypass the CBD entirely (with the existing Harbour Bridge reserved for local traffic).
- Upgrades to existing stations on the Northern Busway.
- "Significant upgrades" to the existing Harbour Bridge, and the raising of State Highway 1 from the bridge to Akoranga to protect it from sea level rise.
- Extending the Northern Busway across the existing bridge to the CBD from Akoranga by allocating it two dedicated lanes, and converting the eastern clip-ons into a fully separated active mode path, leaving the four remaining lanes for general traffic.

The overall cost was estimated as between $35 and $45 billion, which would make it the most expensive infrastructure project in New Zealand's history.

Immediate reactions from experts and commentators was mixed. Supporters of a new crossing in the Green party, Labour's coalition partners, were disappointed that the focus was on increasing road capacity rather than exclusively investing in public transit, whereas on the right Labour's political opponents (including Auckland Mayor Wayne Brown) pointed out that, with the 2023 General Election imminent, it appeared to be an unrealistic pre-election announcement which was overly expensive and unlikely to ever be delivered. National party leader Christopher Luxon expressed some support but with reservations over the proposed schedule and budget, describing it as "one of those projects we want to progress as well." National's transport spokesperson Simeon Brown—a longtime critic of Auckland Light Rail—criticised both the projected cost and the inclusion of a rail tunnel in the plans, but also expressed general support otherwise.

After National's subsequent win in the 2023 General Election the party announced Auckland Light Rail would be cancelled and its $14.6 billion budget spent on a number of road and highway upgrade schemes across New Zealand, including several new busways within Auckland. The proposed road tunnels under the harbour were also still being considered.

By December 2023, after having had time to review the plans in detail, all three of the Ministry of Transport, Auckland Transport, and Auckland City Council noted that there were "significant value-for-money issues" with them as currently proposed. Local planners also noted that without further funding from central government their only options for further transit investment in Auckland were new cycle lanes or continued upgrades to the Northern Busway. Waka Kotahi NZTA chief executive Nicole Rosie criticised the entire Waitematā Harbour Connections planning and consultation process, telling the New Zealand Herald that, "we're making the same decisions they would have made seven to ten years ago—all that's happened in the meantime is the population has grown, the issue has become more urgent, and the costs have gone up."

=== 2026 developments ===
In early 2026, debate intensified over both the preferred alignment and the funding model for a second Waitematā Harbour crossing. In February, Auckland Mayor Wayne Brown renewed his support for a bridge alignment via Meola Reef, arguing that a structure connecting Pt Chevalier to the North Shore near Little Shoal Bay would be shorter and potentially cheaper than options located adjacent to the existing Auckland Harbour Bridge. Brown said the natural lava flow extending approximately 2 km into the harbour could support part of the structure and stated that the proposal would avoid encroaching on Meola Reef Reserve. He reiterated concerns about the cost-effectiveness of tunnel options and alignments close to the existing bridge.

At the same time, the Government signalled that tolling would form part of the funding approach. Infrastructure Minister Chris Bishop confirmed that any new crossing would be tolled, and that officials were advising on whether the existing Auckland Harbour Bridge should also be tolled to prevent traffic diversion to the non-tolled route.

The Infrastructure Commission’s 2026 National Infrastructure Plan stated that additional user revenue would be required to fund the crossing. High-level analysis presented in the plan suggested that a $9 toll on both the new and existing crossings could raise between $7 billion and $9 billion, depending on the tolling period. The Commission noted that tolling only the new crossing would sharply limit revenue, while higher tolls could reduce overall returns by diverting users. The $9 figure reflected the inflation-adjusted equivalent of the original toll removed in 1984.

Transport Minister Bishop described the question of tolling the existing bridge as “a very big decision” for the country and said the Government was working through funding and financing issues in a “methodical and comprehensive way”. He also stated that, in theory, the project should be capable of largely funding itself due to high traffic volumes.

The Infrastructure Commission subsequently clarified that the $9 toll was illustrative and that it was not specifically recommending tolling over other mechanisms such as targeted levies or alternative charges. Finance Minister Nicola Willis described the $9 scenario as “completely hypothetical” and said the Government had not given consideration to implementing such a charge on both crossings.

Mayor Brown opposed a $9 toll on the existing bridge, calling it unacceptable to Aucklanders and arguing that funding decisions should be made jointly with Auckland authorities. ACT leader David Seymour also questioned whether a flat $9 charge would be politically sustainable given cost-of-living pressures.

As of February 2026, NZ Transport Agency Waka Kotahi had completed land- and sea-based geotechnical investigations for the additional crossing, with a formal decision on route and delivery method expected later in the year.

== See also ==
General

- Public transport in Auckland
- Transport in Auckland
- North Shore Line, New Zealand

Specific

- Central Motorway Junction, the major motorway junction connecting southeast of the bridge
- Newmarket Viaduct, similarly important traffic bottleneck on other side of Auckland CBD
- Western Reclamation, large industrial area east of the bridge, possible site of 2nd crossing
