= McKinlay Hendry Ltd v Tonkin & Taylor Ltd =

- Court: Court of Appeal of New Zealand
- Full case name: McKinlay Hendry Limited and Kings Wharf Holdings Limited (in liquidation) v Tonkin & Taylor Limited
- Decided: o9 December 2005
- Transcript: copy of judgment

Court membership
- Judges sitting: Glazebrook, Robertson and Rodney Hansen JJ

McKinlay Hendry Ltd v Tonkin & Taylor Ltd is a cited case in New Zealand regarding the Contracts (Privity) Act 1982 and pre-incorporation contracts.
