= Harbor Tunnel =

Harbour Tunnel or Harbor Tunnel may refer to:

== Australia ==
- Sydney Harbour Tunnel, New South Wales
- Western Harbour Tunnel, New South Wales

== Finland ==
- Helsinki harbour tunnel

== Hong Kong ==
- Cross-Harbour Tunnel, Hong Kong

== United States ==
- Baltimore Harbor Tunnel and associated Harbor Tunnel Thruway, Maryland
- Cross-Harbor Rail Tunnel in New York Harbor between New York and New Jersey
- Ted Williams Tunnel (also known as Third Harbor Tunnel) in Boston Harbor, Massachusetts

== See also ==
- Harbour Bridge (disambiguation)
- Harbour Crossing (disambiguation)
