= Tonkin + Taylor =

Tonkin + Taylor Limited
- Company type: Private
- Industry: Environmental and Engineering consultancy
- Founded: 1959
- Founder: Ralph Tonkin
- Headquarters: Auckland (T+T NZ), Melbourne (T+T AU)
- Area served: New Zealand, Australia and Asia
- Key people: Dr Tim Fisher (Managing Director); Jenn Bestwick (T+T Group Board Chair); Penny Kneebone (Chief Executive, T+T NZ); Nicole Neal (General Manager, T+T AU)
- Website: www.tonkintaylor.co.nz

Tonkin + Taylor is an employee-owned environmental and engineering consultancy company. Its head office is in Auckland, New Zealand with offices in Australia, Malaysia and the wider Asia Pacific region.

Services cover civil, environmental, geotechnical and water resources engineering.

== History ==
In 1959, Ralph Tonkin established a laboratory testing and engineering consulting company Geotechnics Ltd, with technical input from Professor Peter Taylor of University of Auckland. In 1961, Ralph Tonkin and Don Taylor formed a partnership named Tonkin + Taylor. The partnership was active in many engineering projects in New Zealand and Asia, and founded an office in Malaysia in the 1970s.

In 1981, the partnership was restructured into a limited liability company, which has grown into an employee owned company.

== Awards ==
- 2014 Waterview Connection Project
  - Year in Infrastructure Conference Innovation in Roads Award, awarded to the Well Connected Alliance (NZ Transport Agency, Fletcher Construction, McConnell Dowell Constructors, Beca Infrastructure, Tonkin + Taylor, Parsons Brinkerhoff and Obayashi Corporation)
- 2013 Newmarket Viaduct Replacement Project
  - ACENZ Innovate NZ Awards Gold Award
  - NZ Contractors Federation Civil Construction Excellence Award
  - FIDIC Civil Construction Excellence Award
  - NZ Concrete Society Infrastructure and Concrete Award
  - NZ Engineering Excellence Awards Transportation Infrastructure Award
  - Roading Excellence Awards Supreme Award (Major Road Project)
- 2012 Land Damage Assessment Team, Christchurch
  - ACENZ Gold Award of Excellence
- 2011 Rosedale Wastewater Outfall Tunnel, North Shore
  - ACENZ Gold Award of Excellence
  - Ingenium Excellence Award (Winner - Projects over $10 million)
  - New Zealand Contractors Federation Construction Award
  - New Zealand Engineering Excellence Awards (Winner - Water Waste and Amenities Category)
- 2011 Silverstream Landfill Development, Hutt City
  - ACENZ Merit Award of Excellence
  - Ingenium Excellence Awards for Physical Works (Finalist - Projects over $10 million)
  - New Zealand Engineering Excellence Awards (Finalist - Water Waste and Amenities Category)

== See also ==
- ACENZ
- McKinlay Hendry Ltd v Tonkin & Taylor Ltd
