= Auckland Harbour Crossing Swim =

Swimming event in Auckland, New Zealand

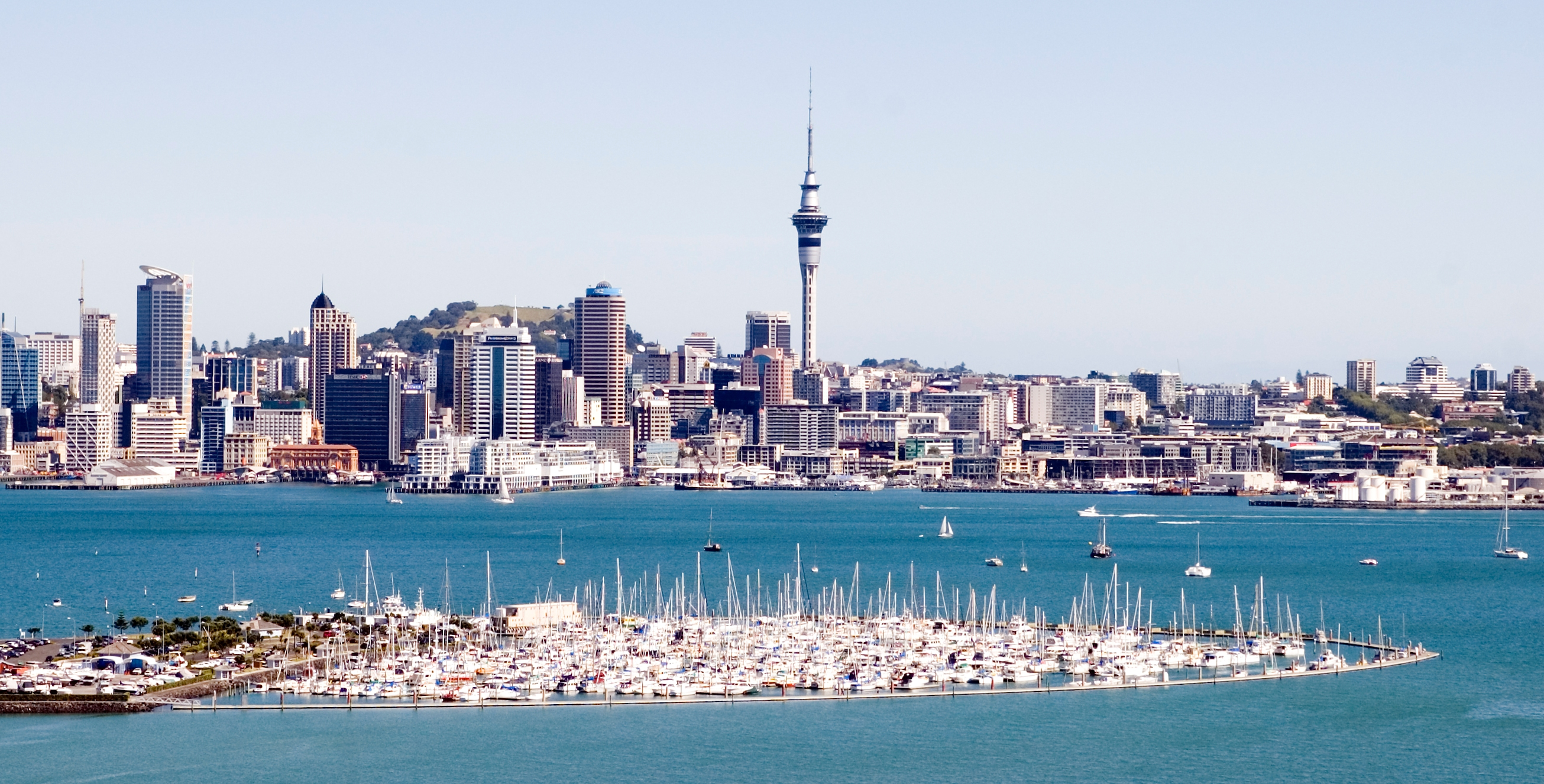
The slightly modified 2009 course took the swimmers from Bayswater Marina (front) to the Viaduct Basin directly opposite on the Auckland waterfront, a 2.8 km distance.

The Auckland Harbour Crossing, also called the Sovereign Harbour Crossing after the sponsoring company, is an annual ocean swim event / race in Auckland, New Zealand. It involves a 2.8 kilometres (1.7 mi) swim across the Waitematā Harbour, with the route going from locations like either Stanley Bay or Bayswater on the North Shore to the finish in the Viaduct Basin in the Auckland central business district. Entrants must complete the course in less than 105 minutes, but the winning competitors usually take little more than 30 minutes for the distance, though tidal currents and wave conditions may modify average times slightly.

The competition was first held in 2004 with about 500 entrants, and as of 2009, attracts more than 1,400 swimmers. The naming sponsor is Sovereign, a New Zealand insurance company which sponsors the 'Ocean Swim' series of swimming events.

The race, while attended by lifeguards and safety boats, and being managed so that shipping traffic in the harbour is stopped for the duration, is not without risk, and there have been two deaths among competitors, once in 2005 (suspected heart attack), and once in 2009. The event attracts amateur swimmers as well as professional athletes. Some celebrities have also taken part, such as Rodney Hide, who however twice failed to succeed in his attempts at completing the event.
