= Upper Harbour Bridge =

Road bridge in Auckland, New Zealand

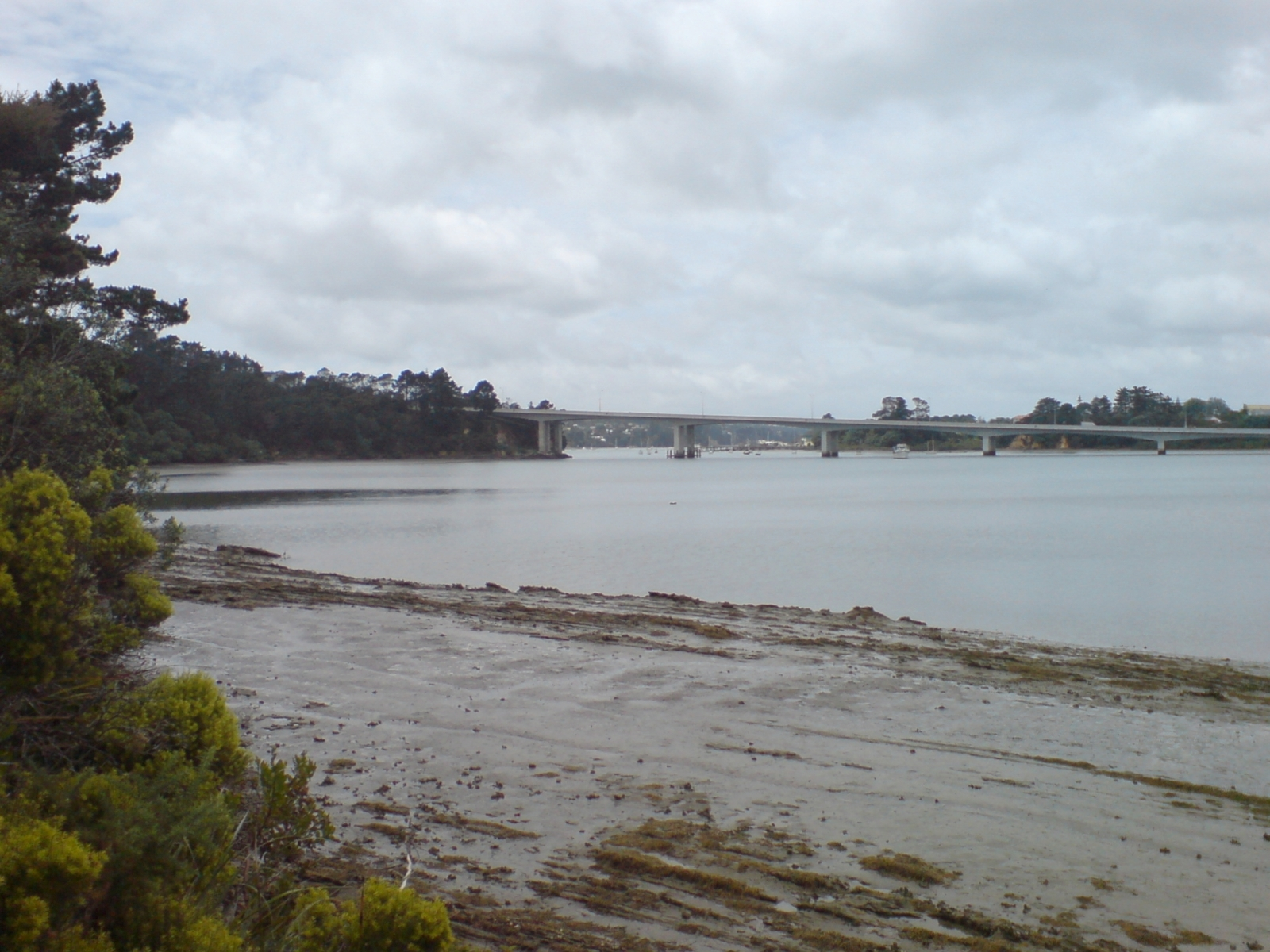
- The bridge from the north.
- Coordinates: 36.784903°S 174.667801°E
- Carries: Upper Harbour Motorway (part of New Zealand State Highway 18); Walk- and cycle-way (north side)
- Crosses: Waitematā Harbour
- Locale: Auckland, New Zealand
- Maintained by: NZ Transport Agency Waka Kotahi

Characteristics
- Width: 16.5 metres (54 ft)
- No. of lanes: Total: 5 motorway lanes; • 3 eastbound (toward Greenhithe); • 2 westbound (toward Hobsonville); • 1 bidirectional shared path

Location
- Interactive map of Upper Harbour Bridge

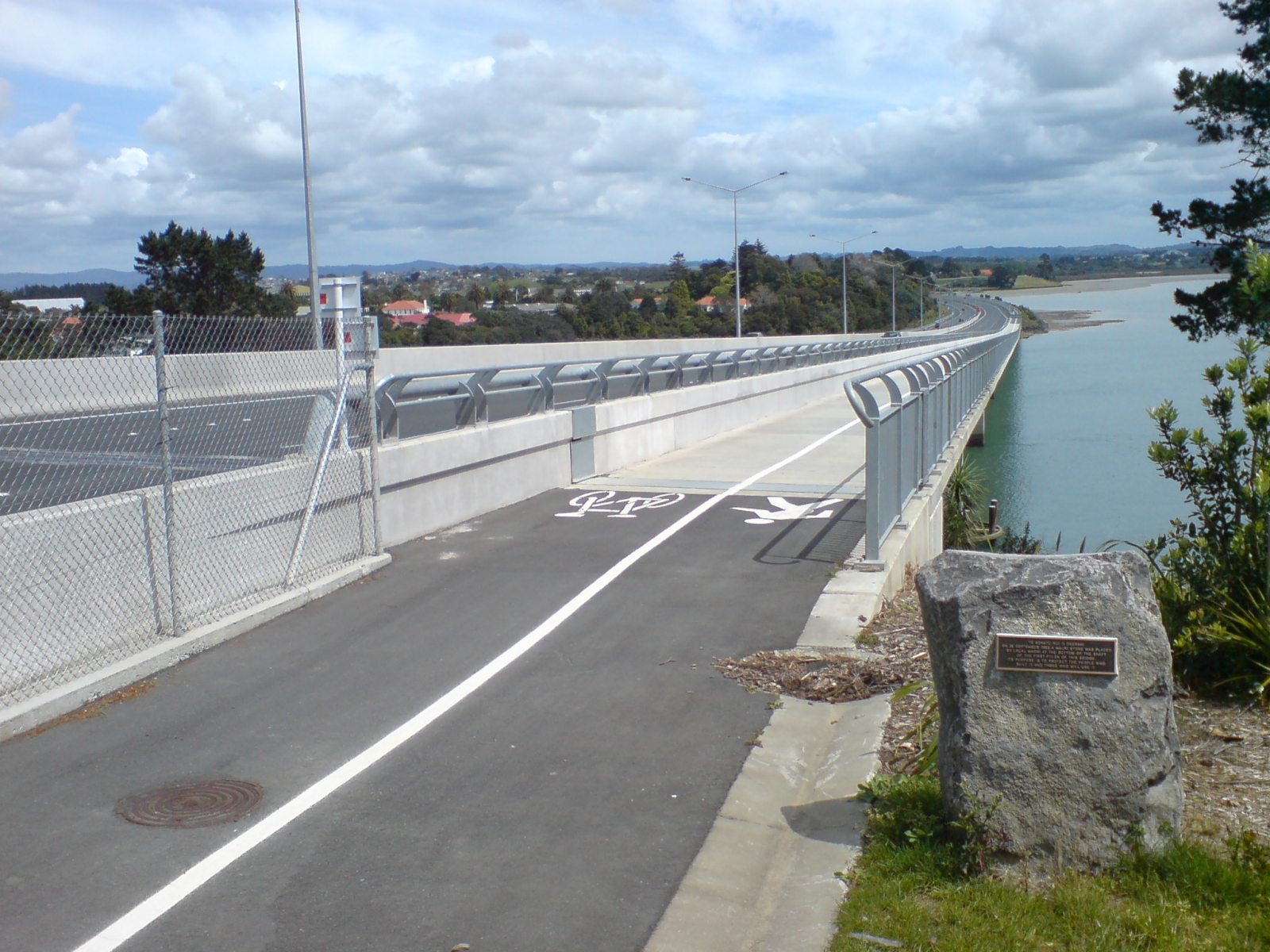
The bridge from the eastern (Greenhithe) end, with the walking / cycling paths and a memorial stone visible.

Map of the two bridges that form the Upper Harbour Bridge

The Upper Harbour Bridge (also called the Greenhithe Bridge) is a motorway bridge in west Auckland, New Zealand. It is technically two bridges, spanning the Upper Waitematā Harbour, and connecting Hobsonville (in West Auckland) and Greenhithe (on the North Shore). It is an important connection for State Highway 18, and became even more important as a component of the Western Ring Route when the route was completed on 2 July 2017.

== History ==
The original bridge was built in November 1975. Its capacity proved insufficient for later traffic demands of more than 27,000 vehicles per day (soon to be up to 35,000 vehicles per day with the completion of the motorway works) and a duplicate bridge was constructed next to it. The new bridge was designed and engineered by Beca, and built between 2005–2006 by Fletcher Construction using self-compacting concrete. The new bridge cost NZ$35 million and provides a 524 m-long (1,719 ft), 16.5 m-wide (54 ft), 10-span crossing. This was designed to match the existing 457 m-long (1,499 ft) 7-span cantilever bridge aesthetically.

The bridges provide three lanes toward Greenhithe (an uphill gradient) and two lanes downhill. Prior to the first stage of the Upper Harbour Motorway opening, Transit NZ closed off the old bridge to make repairs, especially to reduce a sagging effect due to old tensioning cables. With the opening of the motorway on 6 December 2007 all bridge lanes were open. The new bridge also provides a cycle-way and walkway on the north side.

The bridge project, together with the causeway widening, has received a Silver Award from the Association of Consulting Engineers New Zealand.

The original bridge was in 1986 used by A. J. Hackett for the first jumps testing the equipment for what was to eventually become the world's first commercial bungee jumping company.
