= Newmarket Viaduct =

Seven-lane state highway viaduct in Auckland

Coordinates: 36.873767°S 174.777095°E

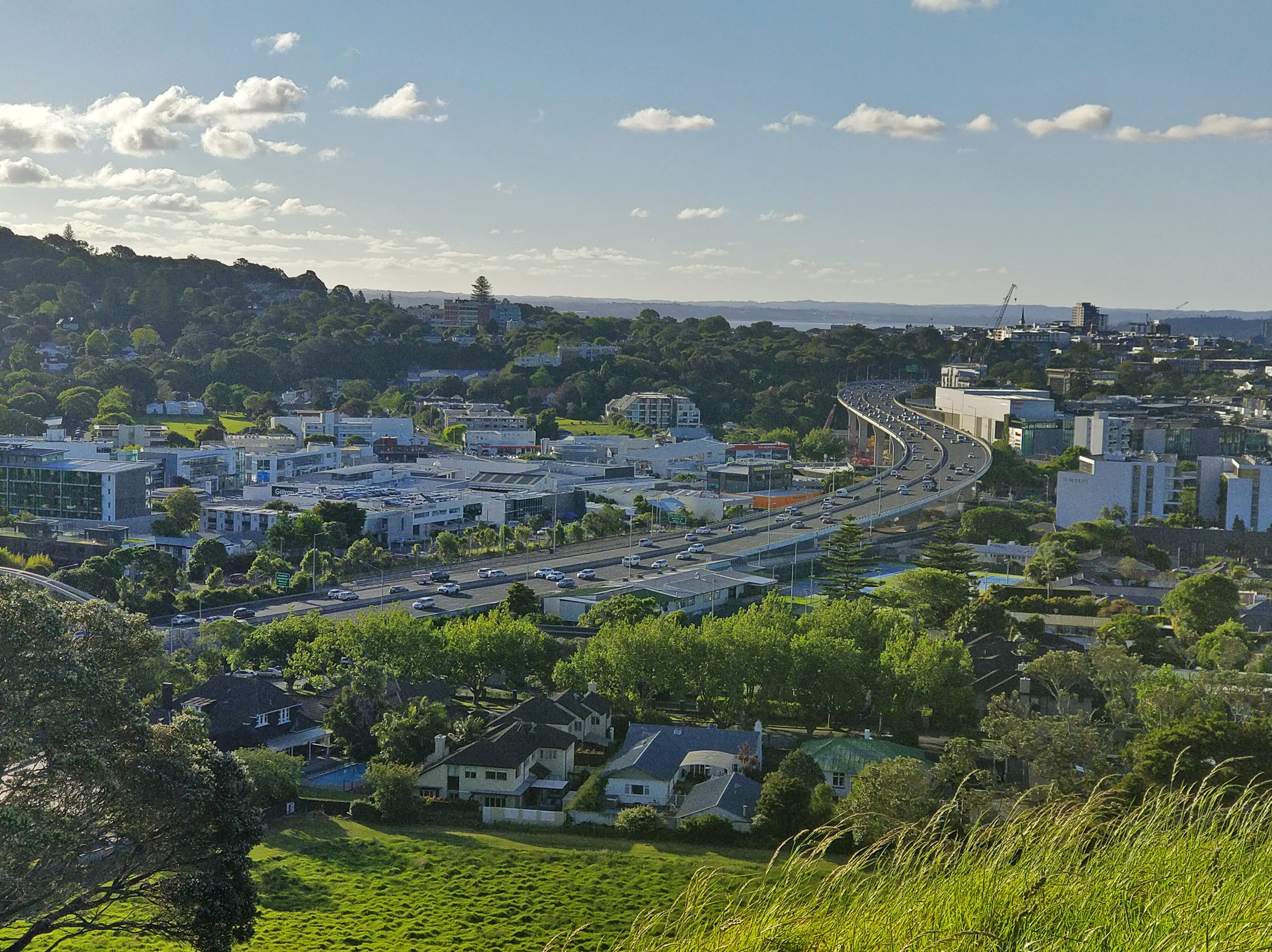
The replacement Newmarket Viaduct as seen from Mount Hobson looking west in 2020.

The Newmarket Viaduct is a seven-lane state highway viaduct in Auckland, New Zealand. The 700 m long viaduct, which is up to 20 m high, carries the Southern Motorway over the Newmarket suburb.

== Original structure ==
The viaduct was opened on 3 September 1966 at a cost of NZ$2.26 million, and was constructed as New Zealand's first pair of balanced cantilever bridges. With its long spans, the s-curvature and the varying superelevation of the motorway, it is a complex structure even today, and at the time was a ground-breaking design for New Zealand.

Constructed between 1962 and 1966, it was the largest pre-stressed concrete bridge in New Zealand at the time. An initial steel girder proposal was considered; however, a concrete structure was chosen, due to the costs of steel importation and maintenance.

While considered a successful design, it was built to far lower earthquake standards than those which other New Zealand structures now fulfill, being built to survive only a 1 in 500-year return period earthquake. It could have received significant damage in an earthquake as common as once in 200 years. This made the structure the weakest strategic transport infrastructure link in the Auckland area, with a potential collapse cutting off all motorway transport to the south. Also, during design, temperature stresses were not yet understood to a sufficient degree, leading to cracking between the black bitumen coat and the light-coloured concrete beams below. This issue was rectified by the additional of additional pre-stressed cables and an additional light-coloured stone chip placed on top of the bitumen.

== Plans for replacement ==
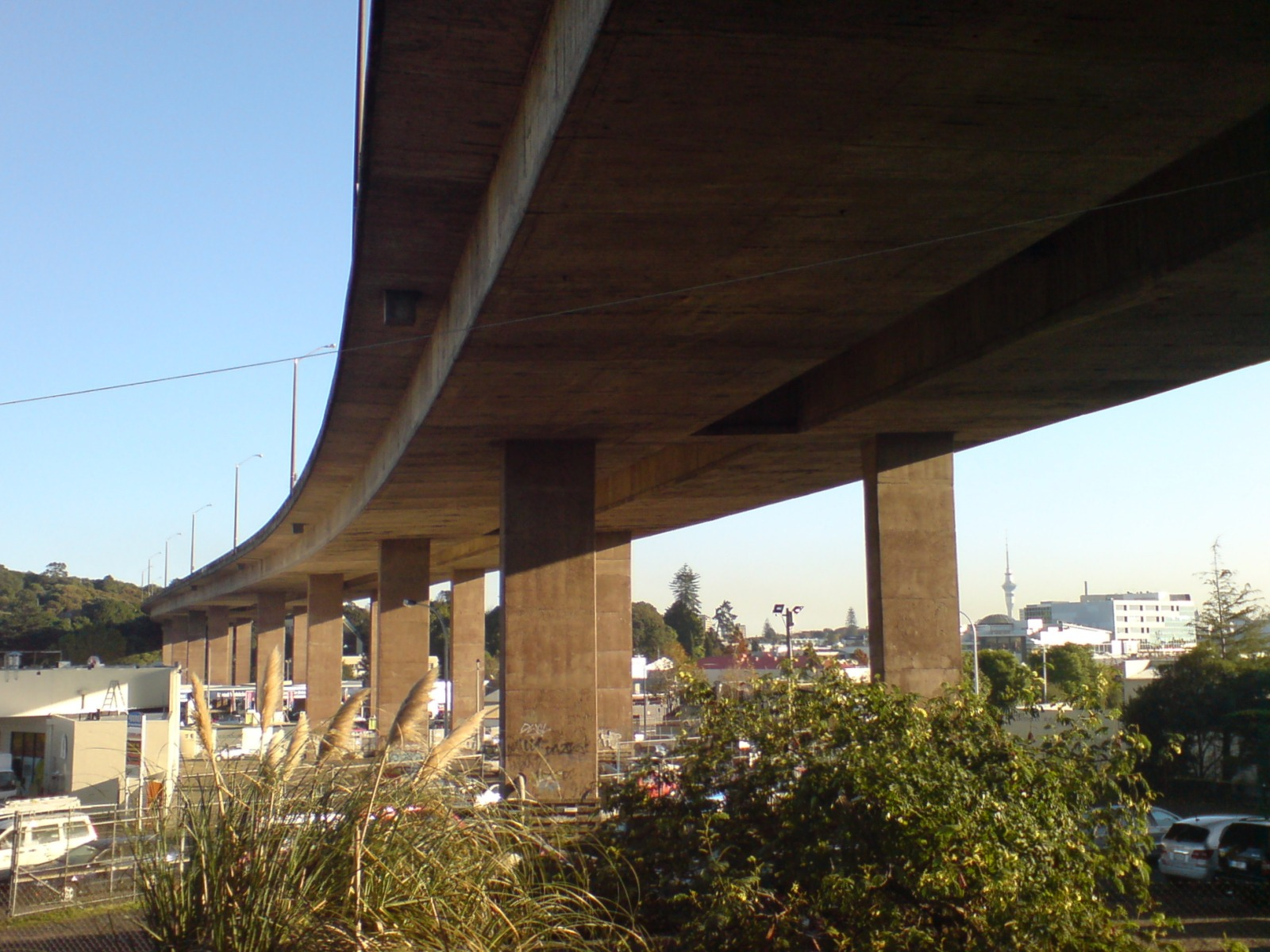
'Concrete box' structure as seen from below, looking west. A truck once toppled over the left side near here.

The limited earthquake stability, together with increasing traffic demands (over 200,000 vehicles a day, more than on the Auckland Harbour Bridge and the most traffic on a section of road anywhere in New Zealand), led to the planning for a new viaduct structure, which would be able to withstand an earthquake with a 2,500-year return period. Other factors were the very low safety barriers (which once allowed an out-of-control truck to fall onto its roof 15 m below, in 2004), which were also insufficient to prevent debris from falling onto the properties beneath, and the fact that the viaduct was a prohibited route for overweight vehicles, forcing more trucks through the city streets.

Major repair of the structure was considered as an option. However, its structural elements did not lend themselves to easy strengthening, and even a reconditioned viaduct would only have provided an estimated life expectancy of 40–50 more years. With a new structure costing only around 15% more than a repair, and expected to last for over 100 years, it was decided to go for a full replacement.

== New structure ==
The new Transit New Zealand structure was estimated to cost NZ$150 million, and cleared planning hurdles quicker than expected, leading to hopes that it would be possible to build it in time for the 2011 Rugby World Cup. Originally, the three-year duration project was expected to start in 2009/2010. Factors that influenced the quick decision process were the lack of any archeological evidence in the construction area, as well as the lack of substantial numbers of residential properties affected by the new structure.

=== Design ===
The new structure was to be constructed in a way to minimally affect the traffic flow on this crucial motorway link, by first constructing a new viaduct of four southbound lanes to the north-east of the existing structure, then demolishing the existing three southbound lanes, before constructing the three new northbound lanes in the gap and finally demolishing the three old northbound lanes. It was originally considered whether to build a 'steel box' or a 'concrete box' structure, though both would look similar to the existing viaduct structure. It was eventually decided to construct a segmented structure built from 468 pre-cast concrete sections constructed off-site in East Tāmaki, and moved into place with a lifting gantry truss.

Tonkin + Taylor and URS New Zealand, as part of the Northern Gateway Alliance, were assigned to develop the new bridge, and one of their design targets included full recycling of all material during the project. The consultant team was also to use the experience gained at the Waiwera Viaduct in this new project. However, estimated costs in June 2008 had risen to NZ$187 million, and it was unclear whether the funds would be made accessible quickly enough to achieve the ambitious schedule of finishing the bridge in time for the 2011 World Cup. In October 2008, funding was confirmed, but the estimated price later increased to NZ$195 million, with rising prices for fuel, construction materials and labour cited as the reasons. While still ahead of schedule, only part of the viaduct replacement was completed in time for the Rugby World cup in 2011.

The new viaduct features better noise protection for the surrounding communities, thanks to noise-absorbing asphalt, solid concrete crash barriers, and partial noise walls. Some further urban design improvements were also part of the project, such as a volcanic-themed walkway from Gillies Avenue down towards Newmarket (connecting to Clovernook Road).

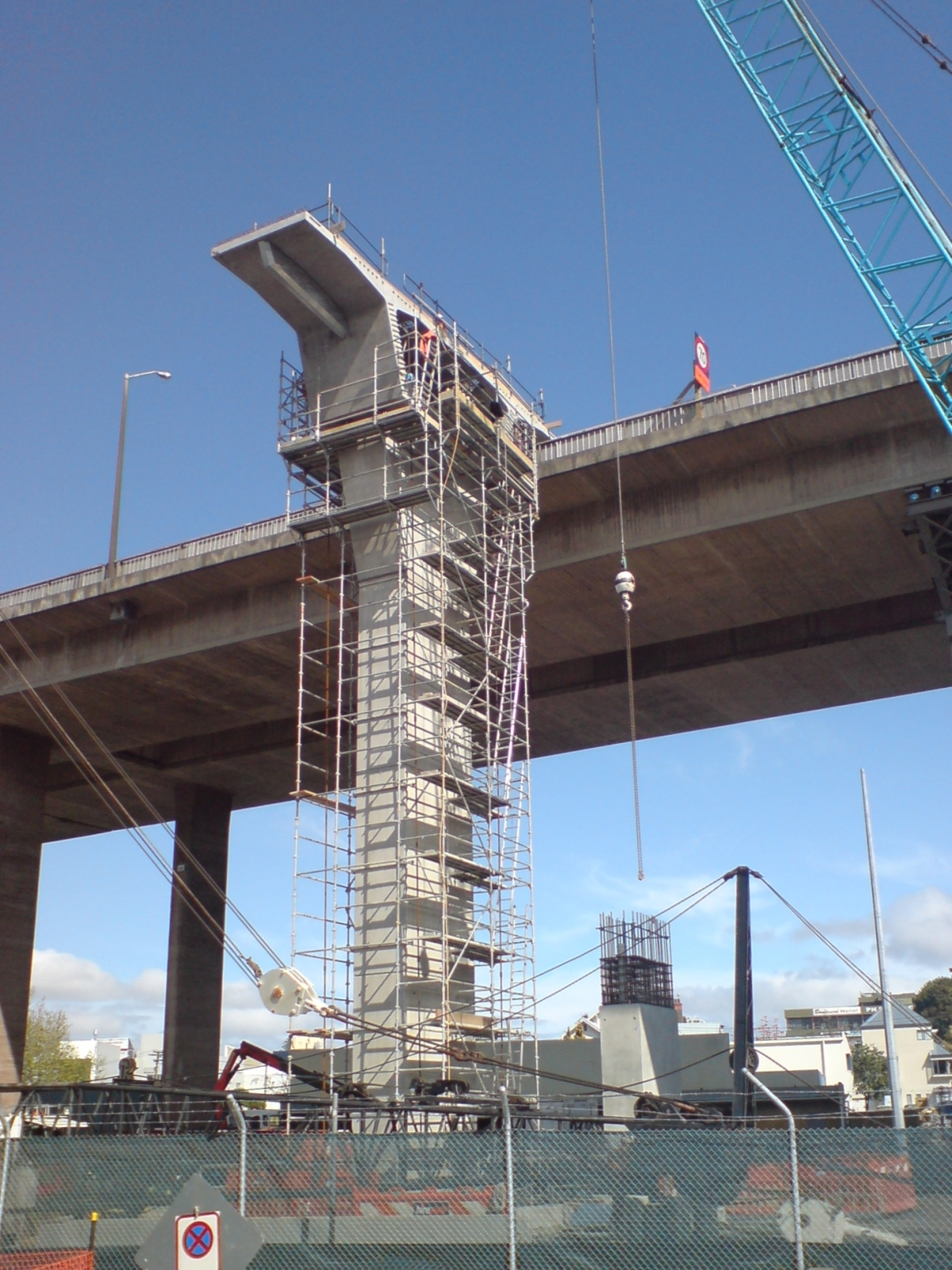
One of the first new columns mostly finished in mid-2009.

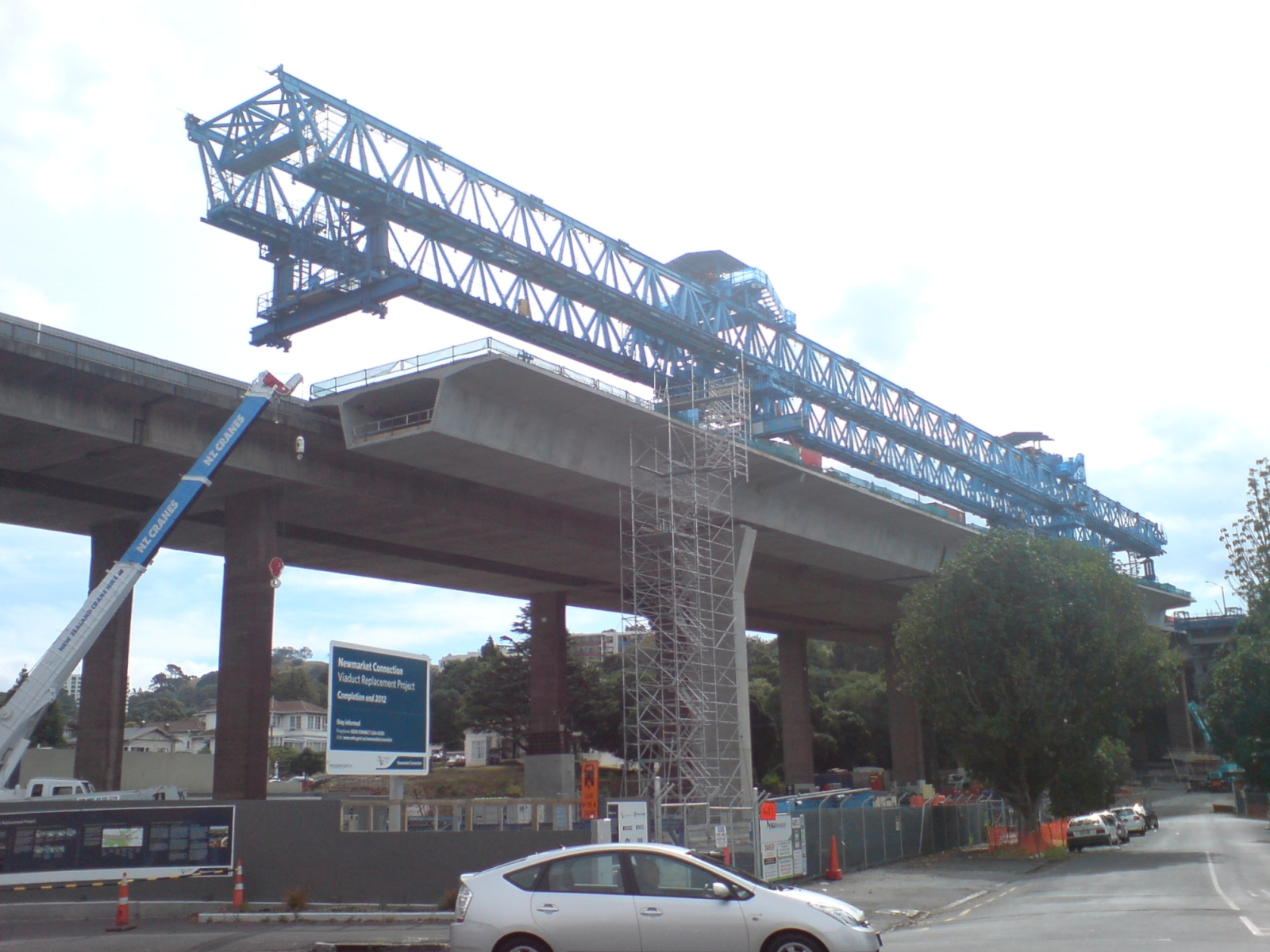
The 'Big Blue' gantry crane working on the new viaduct section in 2010.

Map

=== Construction ===
Construction began in earnest in April 2007, with the first foundations for the up to 18m high piers of the southbound part of the new viaduct. A bracing structure under the section carrying over the railway line was established over Easter 2009, and a 140m long, 800 ton heavy launching gantry was erected above the Newmarket skyline, which moved into place new sections and stabilised parts to be demolished (with the demolition considered the most difficult part of the project). The southbound addition was to be finished by the end of 2010, while the northbound section was expected to take at least until March 2012. During construction, sight screens reduced visual distractions of passing drivers, though the construction still required narrowing of the traffic lanes and reduction of the maximum speed on the viaduct to 70 km/h. A number of temporary support girders around the structure were also required to safely cater for the stresses put on the structure while parts of it were demolished and rebuilt.

Construction involved building the new southbound viaduct first, then demolition of the old southbound viaduct, followed by the construction of the new northbound section in the resulting gap, before the old northbound section was finally demolished. This ensured that except for short interruptions, normal motorway capacity would remain available throughout the construction period. Further work also took place around the viaduct, including the construction of a volcanic-themed walkway from Gillies Avenue to Broadway (via Clovernook Road) and an upgraded footbridge over State Highway 1 at Mt Hobson Road.

The new viaduct is composed of 468 separate bridge deck sections, produced in a precast facility in East Tāmaki.

Over 150 people were employed directly by the project.

=== Awards ===
The work on demolishing the old viaduct sections while the new sections were constructed directly adjacent won the Civils Demolition Award in the 2012 World Demolition Awards.

=== Completion ===
The replacement work was formally completed in March 2013.
