= Western Ring Route =

Road in New Zealand

Western Ring Route

Route information
- Length: 48 km (30 mi)
- History: First section completed in 1955. Route completed in 2017.

Major junctions
- North end: SH 1 near Rosedale
- SH 16 at Westgate; SH 16 at Waterview; SH 20A at Mangere; SH 20B at Puhinui
- South end: SH 20 at Manukau

Location
- Country: New Zealand
- Major cities: Greenhithe, Hobsonville, Massey, Te Atatu, Waterview, Mount Roskill, Onehunga, Mangere, Auckland Airport, Wiri

Highway system
- New Zealand state highways; Motorways and expressways; List

The Western Ring Route is a motorway system in Auckland, New Zealand. It runs along (from south to north) the entire Southwestern Motorway (State Highway 20), most of the Northwestern Motorway (part of SH 16), the entire Upper Harbour Motorway, and the entire Upper Harbour Highway (the last two forming SH 18). When the Upper Harbour Highway is upgraded to motorway status, the route will surpass the Southern Motorway to become the longest motorway in New Zealand at 48 kilometres in length. It runs through Manukau, West Auckland, and the North Shore, bypassing the Auckland city centre and thus providing a second motorway route through the Auckland isthmus.

== History ==
The ring route had been planned as early as the first half of the 20th century. Some critics have alleged that the rerouting of State Highway 1 over the Auckland Harbour Bridge (to ensure toll revenues) was a primary contributor to the decades-long delays. The rerouting is alleged to have significantly contributed to the need for a massive motorway through the centre of Auckland, severely damaging inner city suburbs such as Freemans Bay and Grafton.

The section of SH 20 from Queenstown Road to Richardson Road (the Mount Roskill Extension) opened on 15 May 2009. The section of SH 18 connecting the Greenhithe Bridge and SH 16 (the Upper Harbour Motorway) and the extension of SH 16 to Brigham Creek Road opened in August 2011.

Construction of the Waterview Connection began in late 2011 and it was opened to traffic on 2 July 2017. This completed the route as a highway, with a remaining section of SH 18 still to be upgraded to motorway standard. The opening of the Waterview Connection allows traffic to travel along the entire length of the highway, from SH 1 near Rosedale to SH 1 at Manukau.

The Upper Harbour Highway section was upgraded to motorway status as part of the Northern Corridor Improvements project. Construction started in April 2018 and was completed in June 2023.

== Major junctions ==
Location	km	#	Destinations	Notes
	0.0		SH 1 Northern Motorway (south) – Auckland	Western Ring Route begins
	0.0		SH 1 Northern Motorway (north) – Whangarei	Western Ring Route begins
			Caribbean Drive	
			Paul Matthews Drive	
			Unsworth Drive	Southbound exit only
	2.4	2	Route 26 Albany Highway	Motorway begins
Greenhithe	4.3	4	Greenhithe Road	Southbound exit and northbound entrance
Greenhithe	6.2	6	Tauhinu Road	Northbound exit and southbound entrance
Greenhithe	7.4	Upper Harbour Bridge over Waitematā Harbour		
Hobsonville		8	Squadron Drive	Southbound exit and northbound entrance
Hobsonville		9	Brigham Creek Road – Whenuapai, Helensville	to north
Hobsonville		10	Trig Road	Southbound exit and northbound entrance
Westgate		11	Route 32 Hobsonville Road	Southbound exit and northbound entrance
Westgate			SH 16 Northwest Motorway (north) – Kumeu, Helensville	
Westgate	19.4		Route 32 Hobsonville Road	Northbound exit and southbound entrance
Massey East	17.8	18	Royal Road	Northbound exit and southbound entrance
Lincoln North	15.6	16	Route 19 Lincoln Road – Henderson	
Te Atatū South	13.5	14	Route 13 Te Atatu Road – Henderson	
Avondale North	12.3	12	Patiki Road – Avondale, New Lynn	Southbound exit and northbound entrance
Avondale North	10.8	11	Rosebank Road	Westbound exit and eastbound entrance
Point Chevalier	8.2	8B	SH 20 Southwest Motorway (south)	Beginning of Waterview Connection
Point Chevalier	8.1	8A	Route 11 Great North Road – Avondale, New Lynn	Southbound exit and northbound entrance
Point Chevalier			SH 16 Northwest Motorway (east) – Auckland City Centre, Port	
Point Chevalier		Waterview Tunnel		
Mount Roskill		Waterview Tunnel		
Mount Roskill			Maioro Street	
Mount Roskill		18	Route 4 Dominion Road	
Hillsborough		16	Route 15 Hillsborough Road	
Hillsborough		15	Route 12 Queenstown Road — Auckland City Centre	Northbound exit and southbound entrance
Onehunga		13	Neilson Street — Onehunga Wharf, Onehunga, Penrose, Mt Wellington	
Onehunga		Māngere Bridge over Manukau Harbour		
Māngere Bridge		Māngere Bridge over Manukau Harbour		
Māngere Bridge		12	Mahunga Drive — Māngere Bridge Township, Favona	Southbound exit and northbound entrance
Māngere		10	Walmsley Road	Southbound
Māngere		10	Coronation Road	Northbound
Māngere		9	SH 20A — Airport	No southbound entrance (use SH20B or Massey Road); Carriageway mainline connects north to west, traffic proceeding from/to south on motorway must 'exit'.
Māngere		7	Route 14 Massey Road	
Puhinui		3	SH 20B Puhinui Road — Airport	No northbound exit (use Cavendish Drive); Southbound entrance and connection to SH 20B and
Puhinui		3	Route 30 Cavendish Drive	No southbound exit (use Puhinui Road); Northbound entrance and connection to SH 20B and
Manukau CBD		2	Lambie Drive — Manukau City Centre	
Manukau CBD		1	SH 1 Southern Motorway north — Auckland	Western Ring Route ends
Manukau CBD			SH 1 Southern Motorway south — Hamilton	Western Ring Route ends
1.000 mi = 1.609 km; 1.000 km = 0.621 mi
