= Hawke Scout Hall =

The Ship, Coxs Bay, Auckland
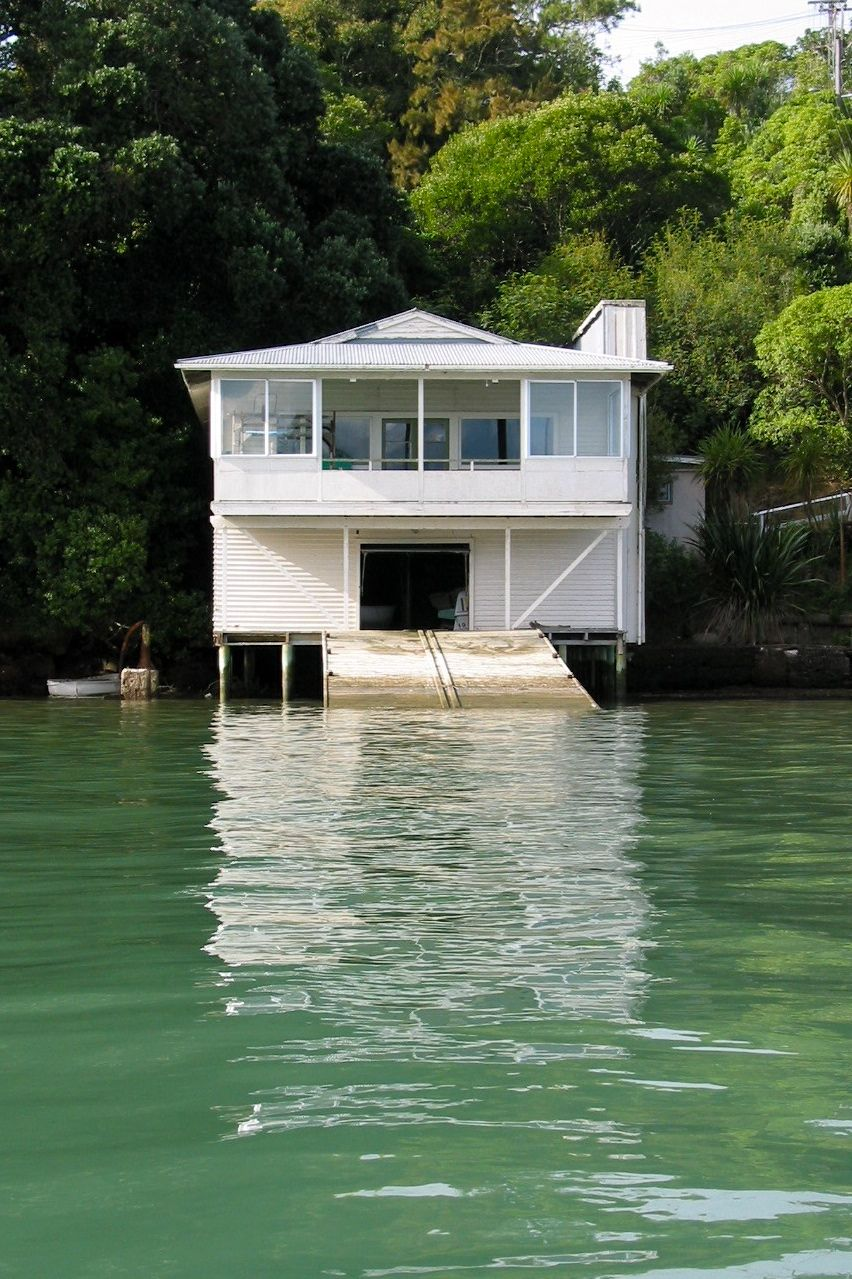
- Interactive map of the The Ship, Coxs Bay, Auckland area
- Alternative names: Hawke Sea Scout Hall

General information
- Type: Boatshed and Scout hall
- Location: Auckland, New Zealand
- Coordinates: 36°50′59.70″S 174°43′30.15″E
- Current tenants: Hawke Sea Scouts
- Construction started: 1952
- Completed: 1953

Design and construction
- Architect: Vernacular design
- Main contractor: Local volunteers

The Hawke Scout hall is a building located on the edge of Coxs Bay, which is between the suburbs of Herne Bay and Westmere in Auckland, New Zealand. It is primarily used by Sea Scouts.

== History ==
In 1928, a boat shed was erected at the foot of Jervois Road on a reserve vested by special legislation and became the headquarters of Hawke Sea Scouts. As the group grew in size a hall was built over the top of the old boat shed in 1943. In 1951 "The Ship", as the building is locally referenced, was further extended. On 21 July 1952 a fire swept through the building with almost total loss of building and gear. In addition to locally significant trophies destroyed, an item of national historical significance was lost in the fire; this was the White Ensign flown by the NZ cruiser HMNZS Achilles during the Battle of the River Plate and also flown at the Surrender of Japan at the end of World War II.

Rebuilding of the hall commenced immediately and the new and current building was opened on Saturday 17 October 1953 by Sir John Allum. Some of the major structural timbers and the floorboards of the upper level are Oregon Pine. These were donated by the USMC - US Fleet Marine Force, Pacific who were based in Auckland during World War II and were de-constructing their pre-fabricated buildings at the Western Springs camp at this time. One of the factors which allowed the rebuild to occur so quickly was a committee of local women, who had entitled themselves "The Hawke Sea Scouts Ladies Auxiliary", who provided an organisational and financial backbone. This was a unique involvement in Scouting at the time, which was primarily a male organisation and the youth were all boys.

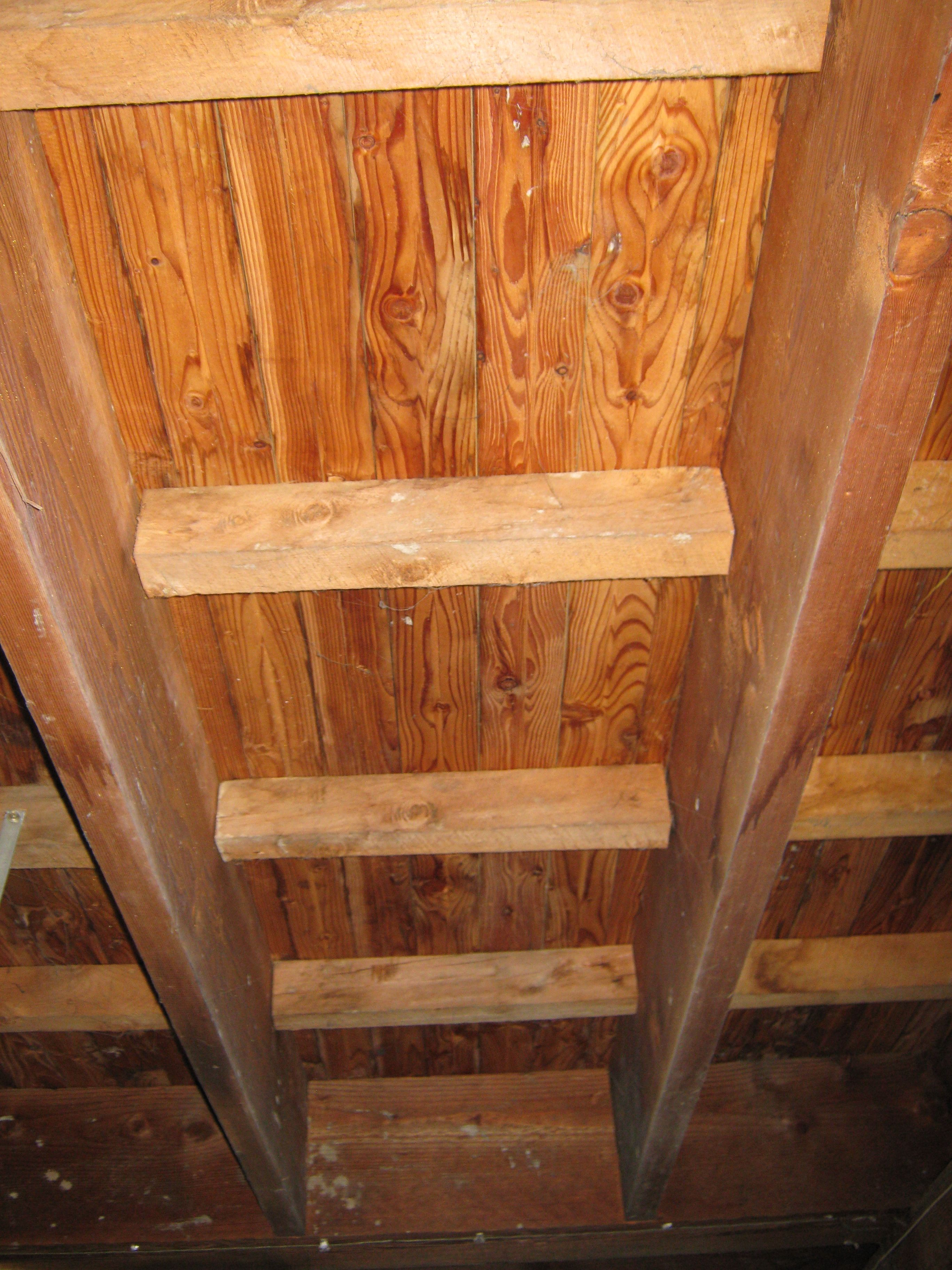
Oregon Pine donated by USMC to rebuild "The Ship"

The building and the group feature in a local history and also extensively in a semi-autobiographical novel. Because of its relative uniqueness on the Auckland coast as a traditional vernacular weatherboard building which is not a private boat-shed it is much sought after as a venue, particularly for theatrical performance.
