= Scout hall =

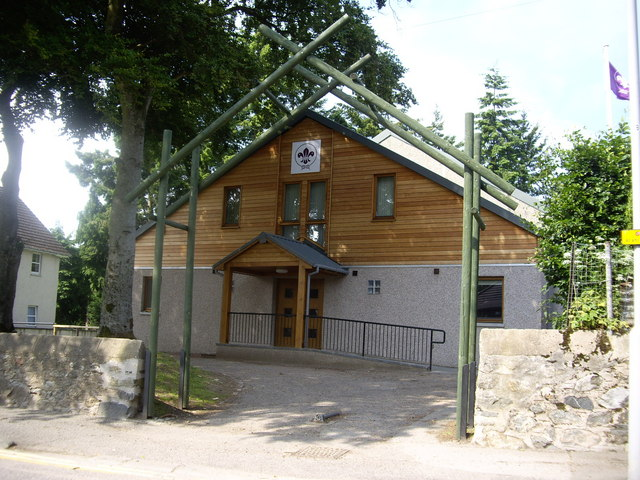
A Scout hall in Banchory, Scotland

A Scout hall (also Scout hut, Scout den or Scout headquarters) is a building owned or rented and used as a meeting place by a Scout Group.

== General description ==
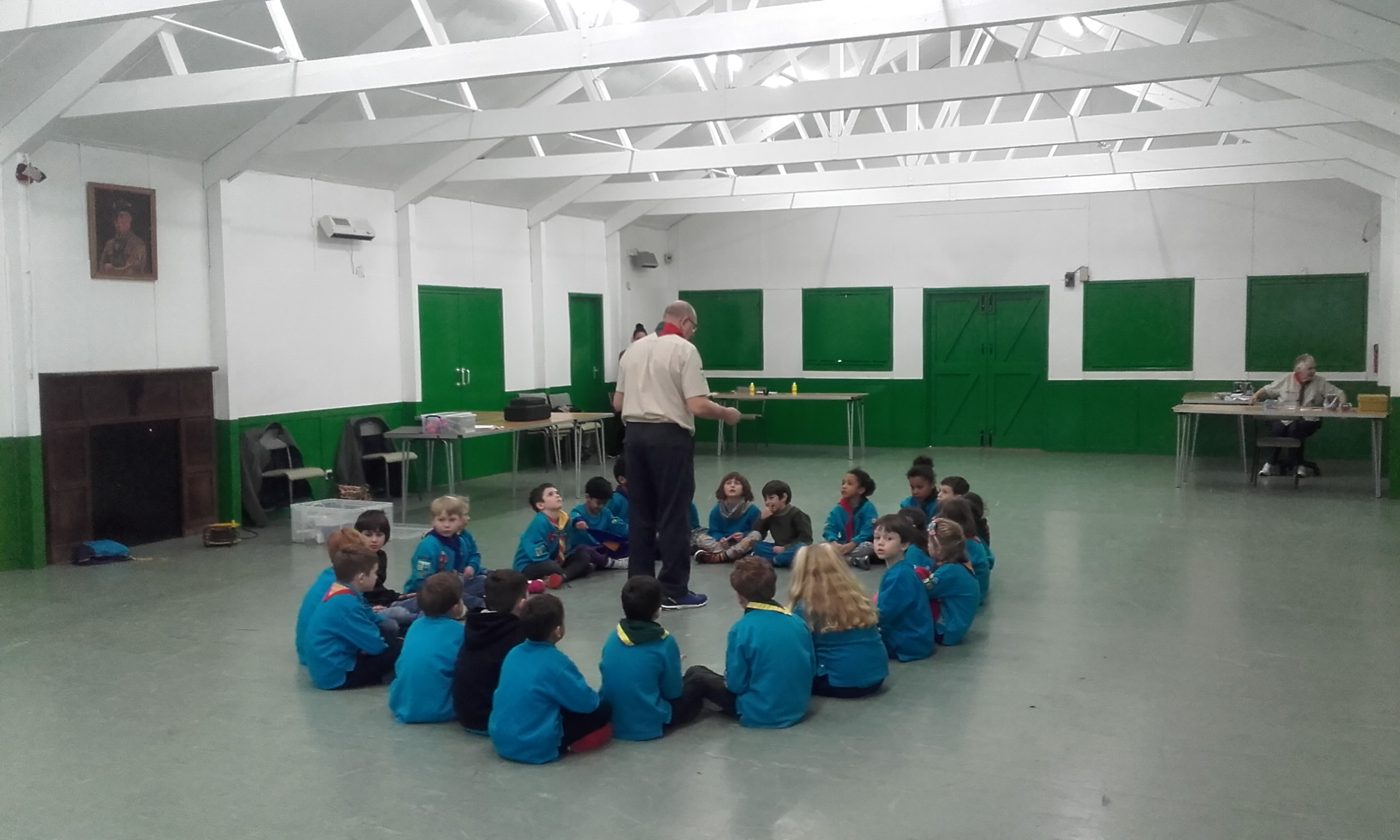
Beaver Scouts prepare for a game in a Scout hall in East London.

A Scout hall typically consists of one or more large rooms which are used for games and Scouting activities, and may also include smaller rooms for committee meetings, storage of camping equipment and a kitchen. When not being used for Scouting, Scout halls are often hired to other community groups, in a similar way to a village hall or community centre.

If the Scout hall consists of several large rooms, the various sections can have their own large room. Rooms for younger sections, such as Beaver Scouts, Rainbow Guides, Cub Scouts and Brownie Guides, are decorated with pictures and objects from their theme. Rooms for older sections are decorated with maps, knots, (small) examples of Scoutcraft and camp souvenirs. In a room for the Scout troop each patrol should have its own section.

A Scout hall can be built for this use or a reuse of a building or part of a building that is not well suited for a different purpose. Sea Scout Groups may have an old cargo ship as a movable Scout hall. If there is space available, there is often a small or larger campsite next to a Scout hall. Scout halls are also used, by other Scout Groups, in particular for the younger sections, for camps or sleepovers.

== Notable Scout halls ==
=== Arkadelphia Boy Scout Hut ===
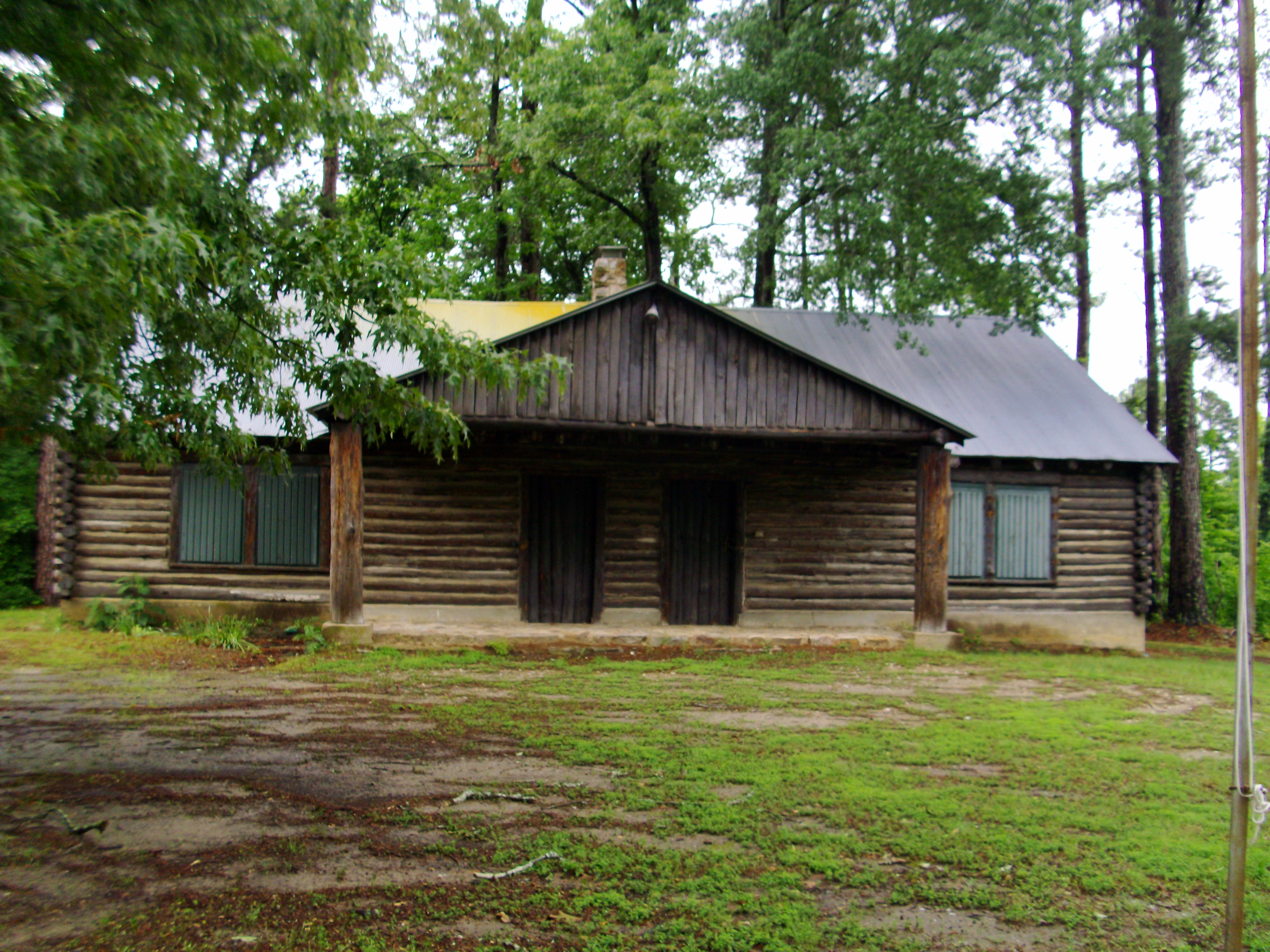
The Arkadelphia Boy Scout Hut

The Arkadelphia Boy Scout Hut, in Central Park in Arkadelphia, Arkansas, in the United States, is on the National Register of Historic Places. The hut was constructed from 1938 to 1939 as a National Youth Administration project during the Great Depression.

=== The Barn Scout Hall ===
The Barn Scout Hall is a heritage-listed former whaling boat servicing facility and now Scout hall and community facility in Mosman, New South Wales, Australia. It was built by Archibald Mosman. The property was added to the New South Wales State Heritage Register on 2 April 1999.

=== Hawke Scout Hall ===
Hawke Scout Hall is on the edge of Coxs Bay in Auckland, New Zealand. It originated in 1928 as a boat shed which became the headquarters of Hawke Sea Scouts; a hall was built over the top of the old boat shed in 1943. The whole building was destroyed by fire in 1952; lost amongst the contents was the White Ensign flown by the cruiser HMNZS Achilles during the Battle of the River Plate. It was rebuilt in the following year with help from the local community and the US Marines.

=== Portsoy Scout Hut ===
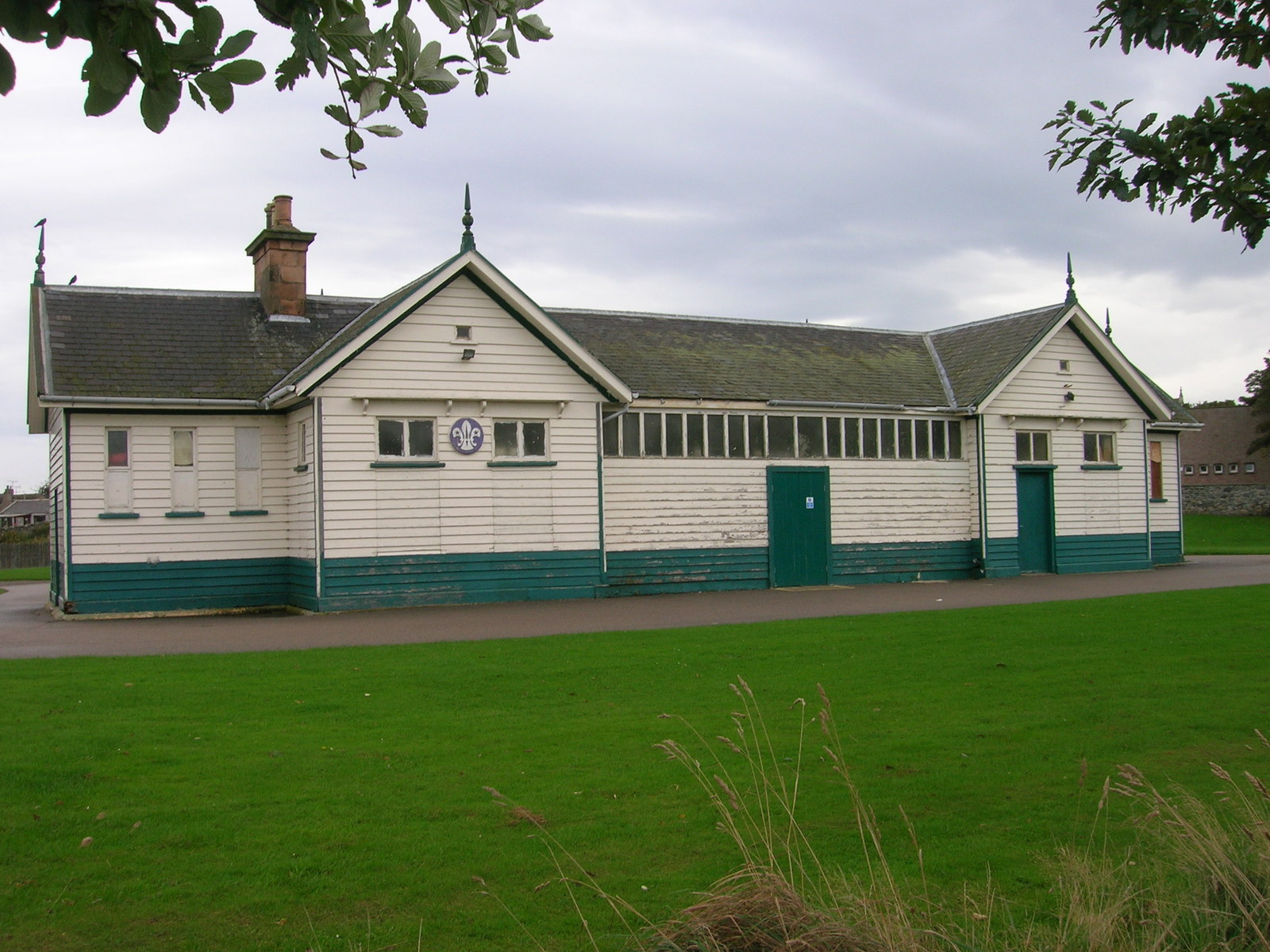
The 1884 Portsoy railway station, now a Scout hall and a listed building.

The wooden building now used as a Scout hall by the 1st Portsoy Scout Group in Aberdeenshire, Scotland, was originally the town's railway station. Built in 1884, the station closed in 1968 and became a Category C listed building in 1995.

=== Terrace Park Girl Scout Cabin ===
Terrace Park Girl Scout Cabin is a Girl Scouts clubhouse at Big Stone Gap, Wise County, Virginia. It was built in 1938 by the National Youth Administration and listed on the National Register of Historic Places in 2007.

=== Ulftorp Scout hall ===
In 1953, the postmodern architect Ralph Erskine built the Ulftorp Scout hall for the KFUM Brommas Scoutkår in Bromma, Sweden. The building, on the island of Lovön in Lake Mälaren, was designed around a central fireplace heating a large common room and two small rooms on the lower floor as well as a sleeping room on the upper floor. The roof was formed like a campfire, mirroring Erskine's idea that everybody should gather around the fire. The Scout hall burned down in the late 1960s.

== Scout halls and popular music ==
Because of their availability as a relatively low-cost space, Scout halls have sometimes been used by emerging rock or pop bands as a rehearsal or performance venue. Notable examples are: Cream, who initially rehearsed in a Scout hut in north London in July 1966; the Stranglers, who rehearsed in a Scout hut at Shalford, Surrey, in 1974; and the Undertones, whose first public performance in 1976 was at a Scout hut in Derry. In a 2006 interview, George Michael stated that his first public performance had been with a band in a Scout hut at Bushey in Hertfordshire.

== Gallery ==
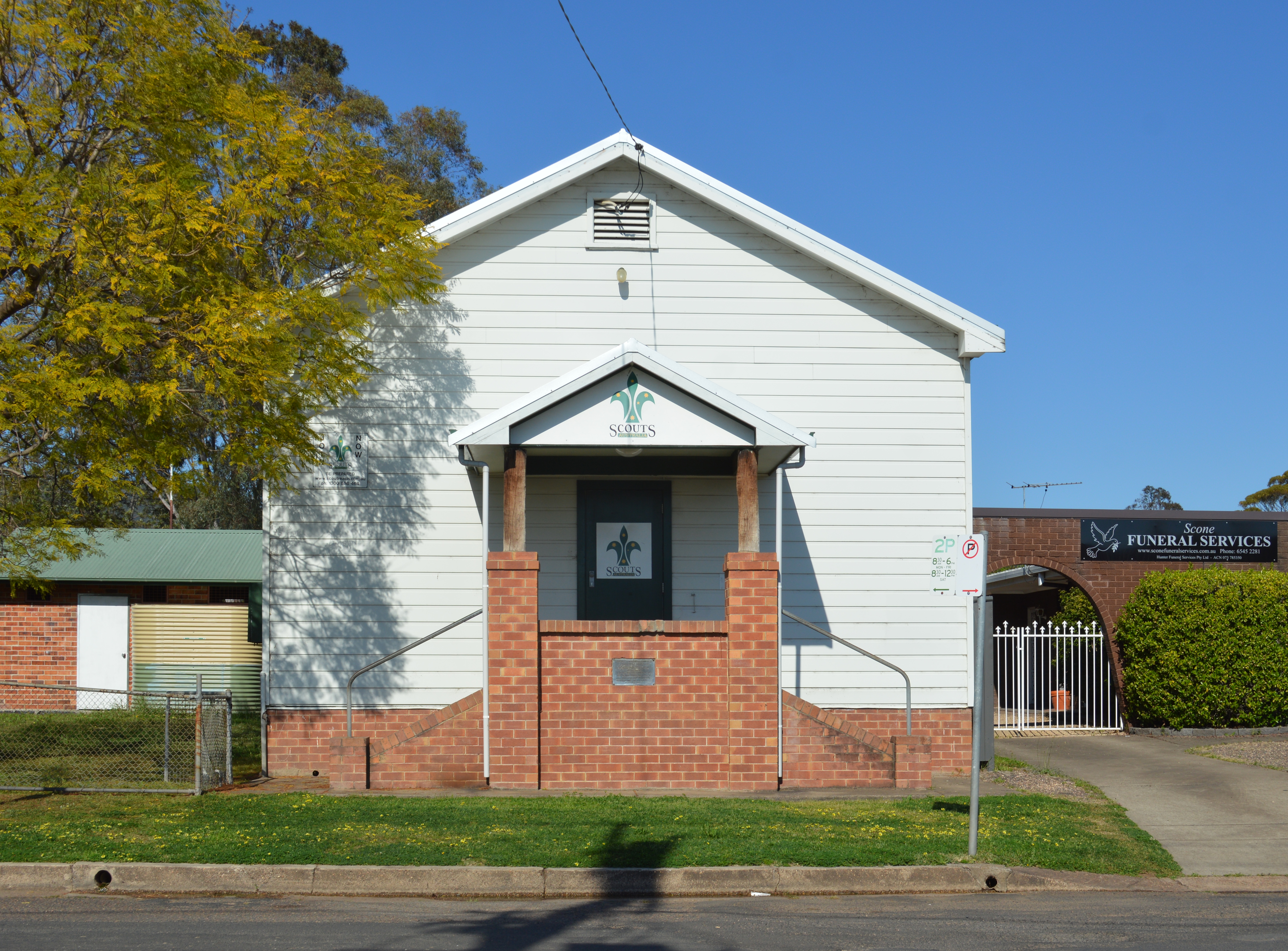
The Scout hall in Scone, New South Wales, Australia

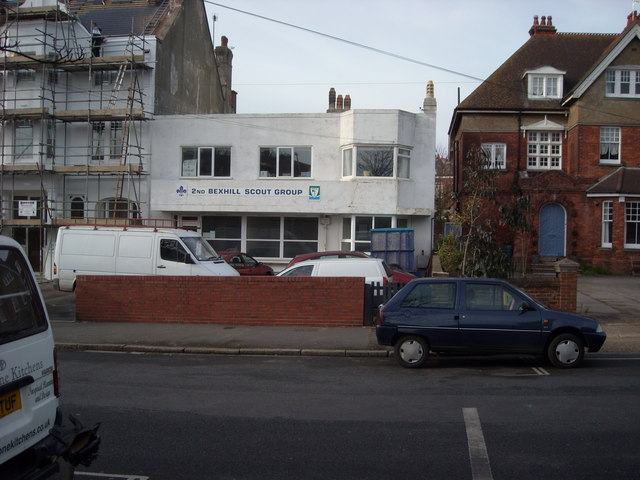
A Scout headquarters in Bexhill-on-Sea, England

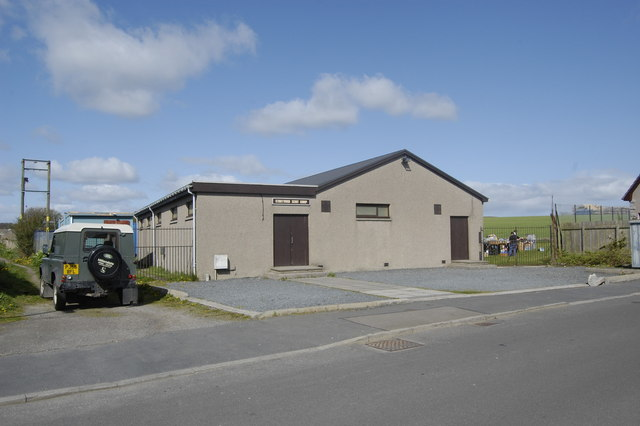
A Scout hall in Stoneywood, Scotland

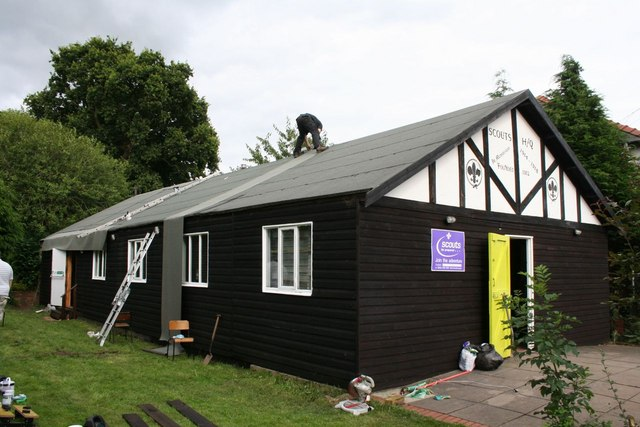
A traditional Scout hut in Rhosnesni, Wales, dating from 1925

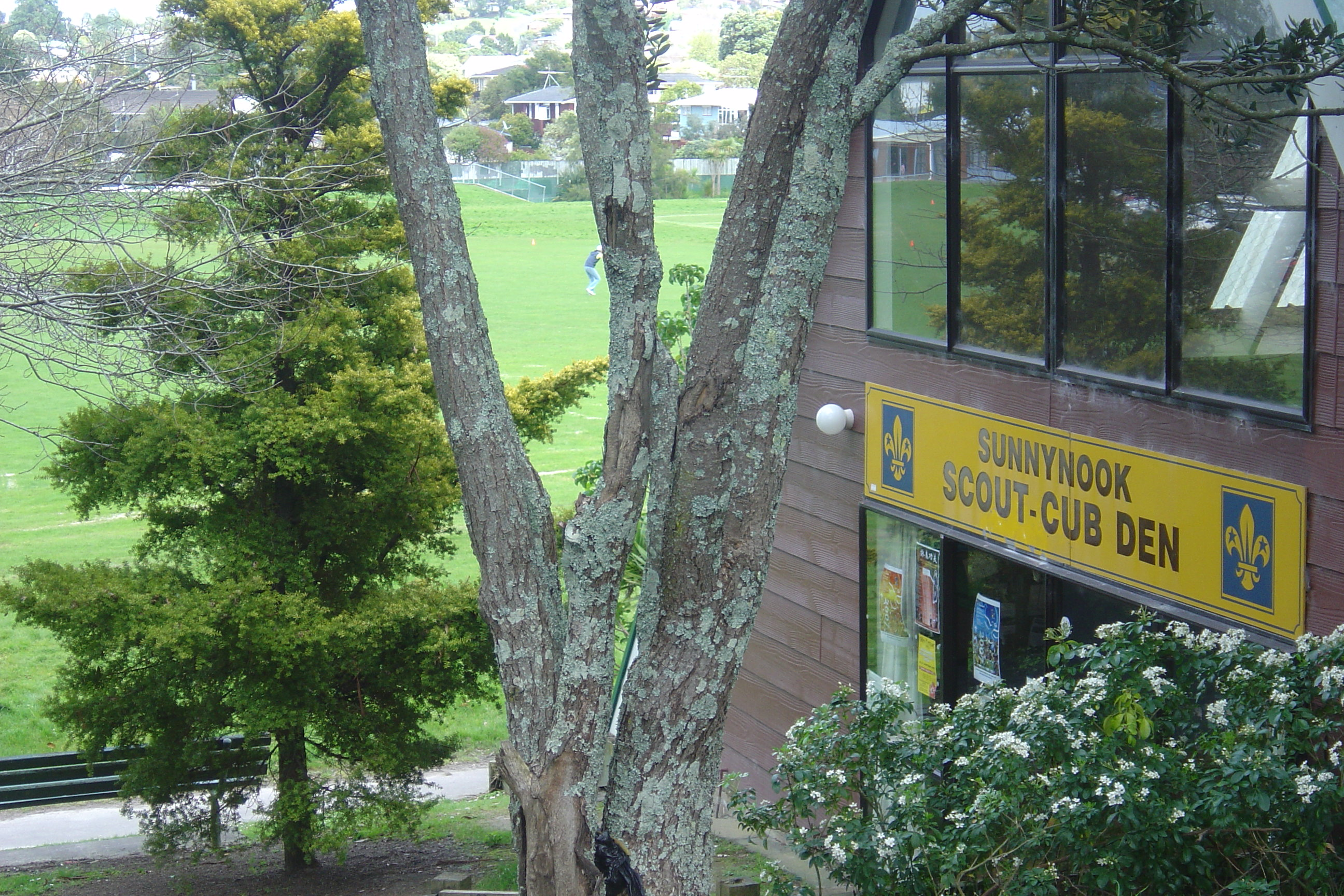
A Scout den in Sunnynook, New Zealand

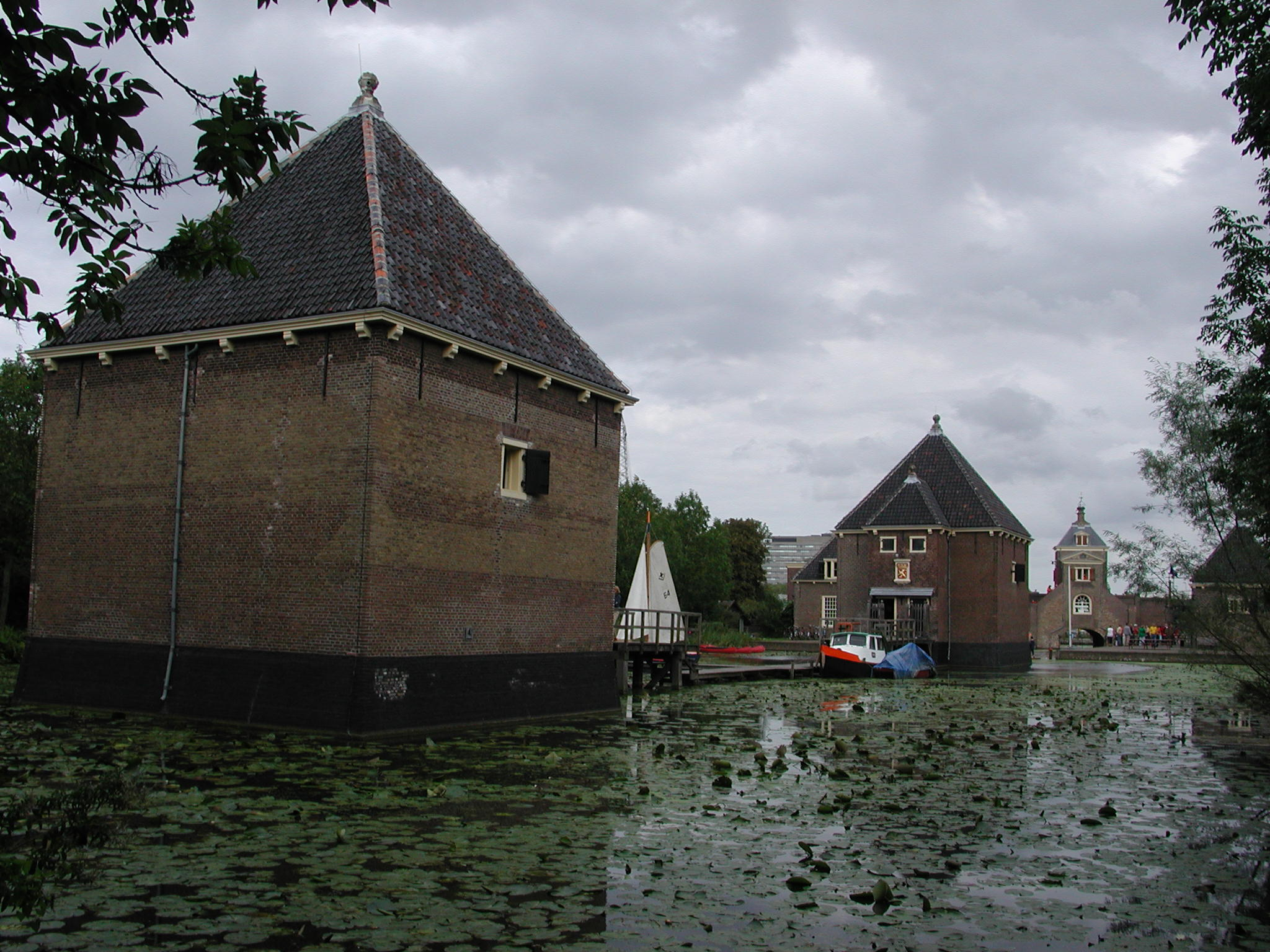
Reuse of an old military complex in Delft, the Netherlands

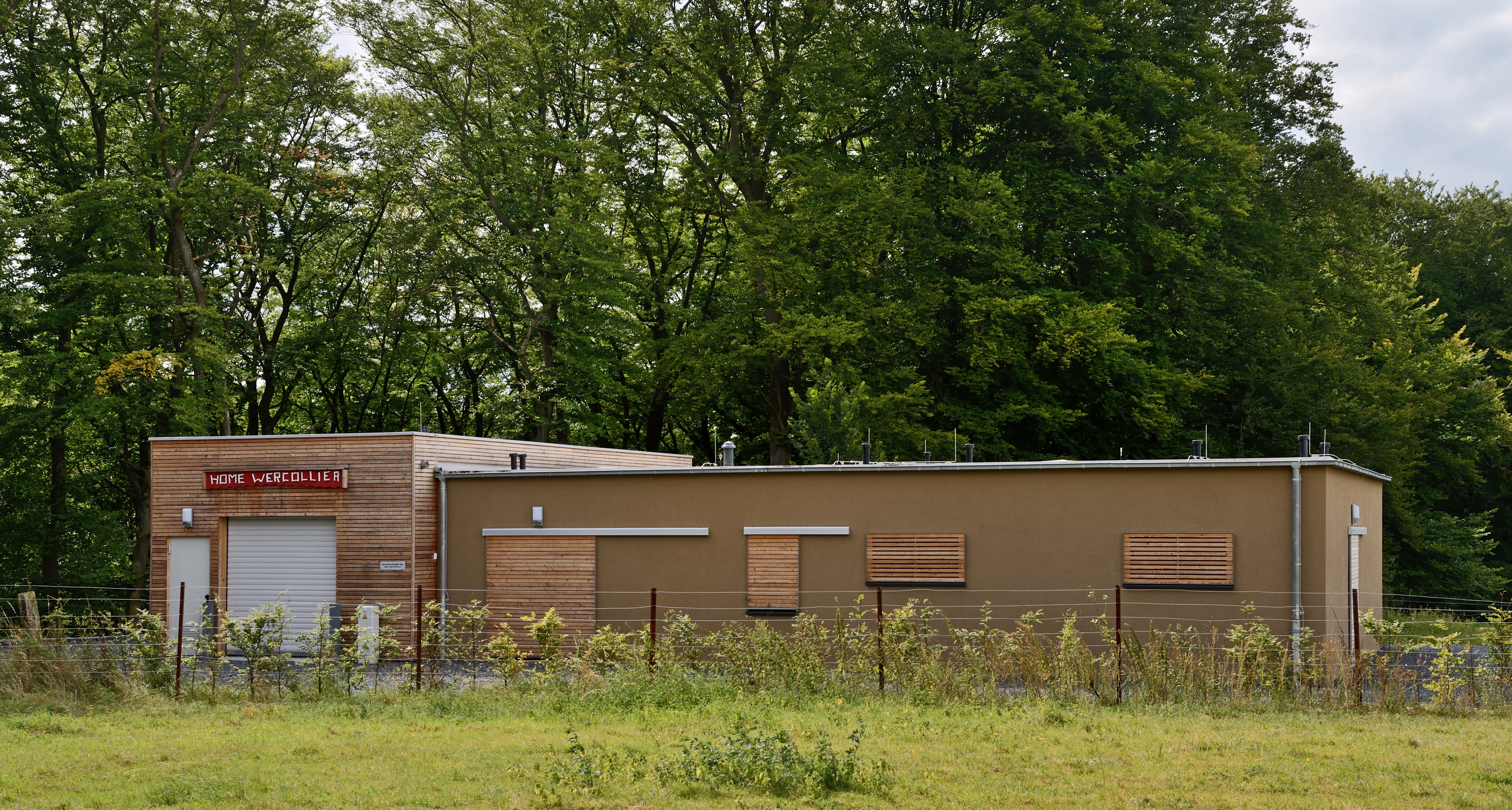
Home of a local Scout group in Bridel, Luxembourg

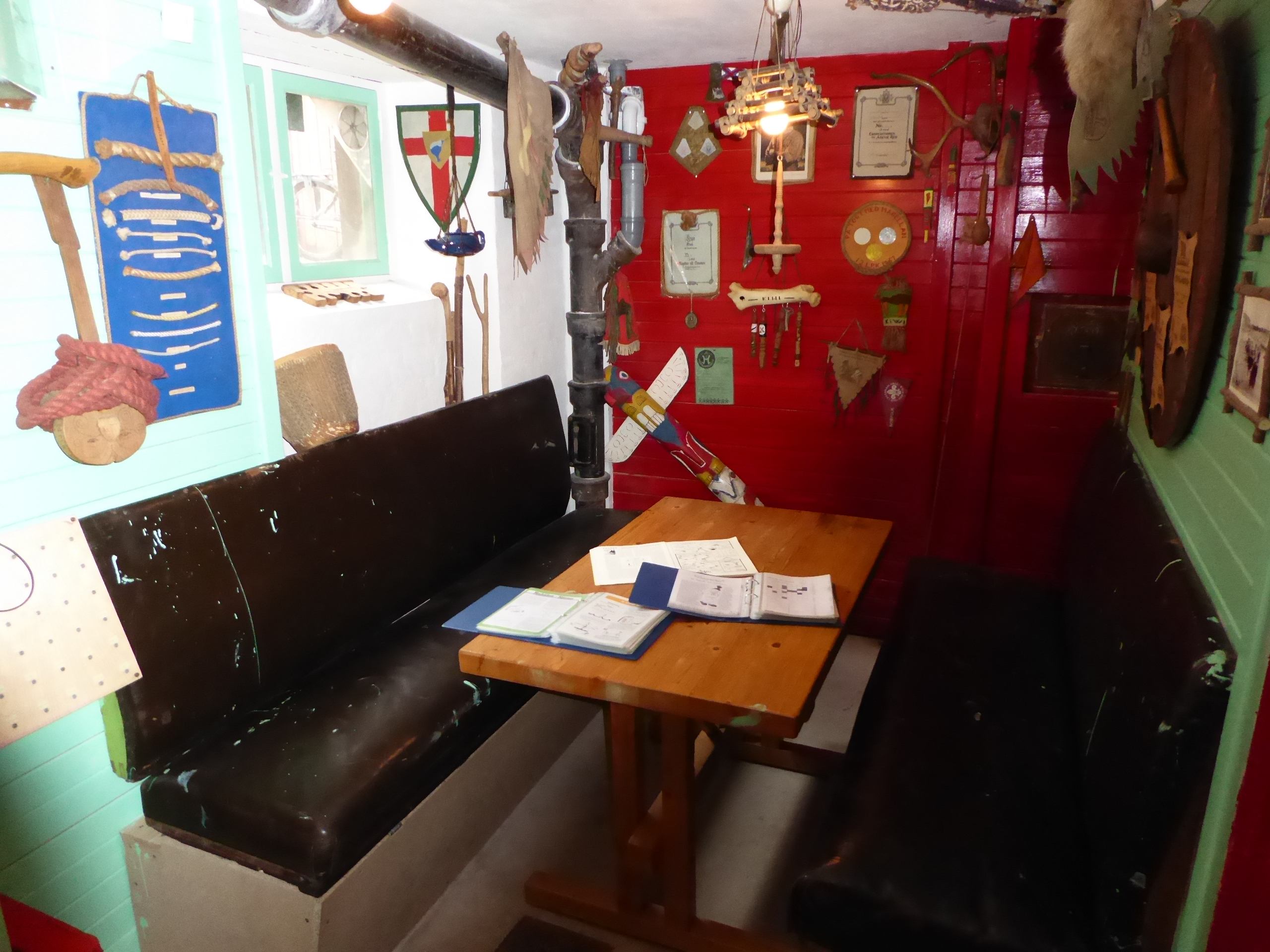
Interior of Scouts' club room in Aarhus, Denmark

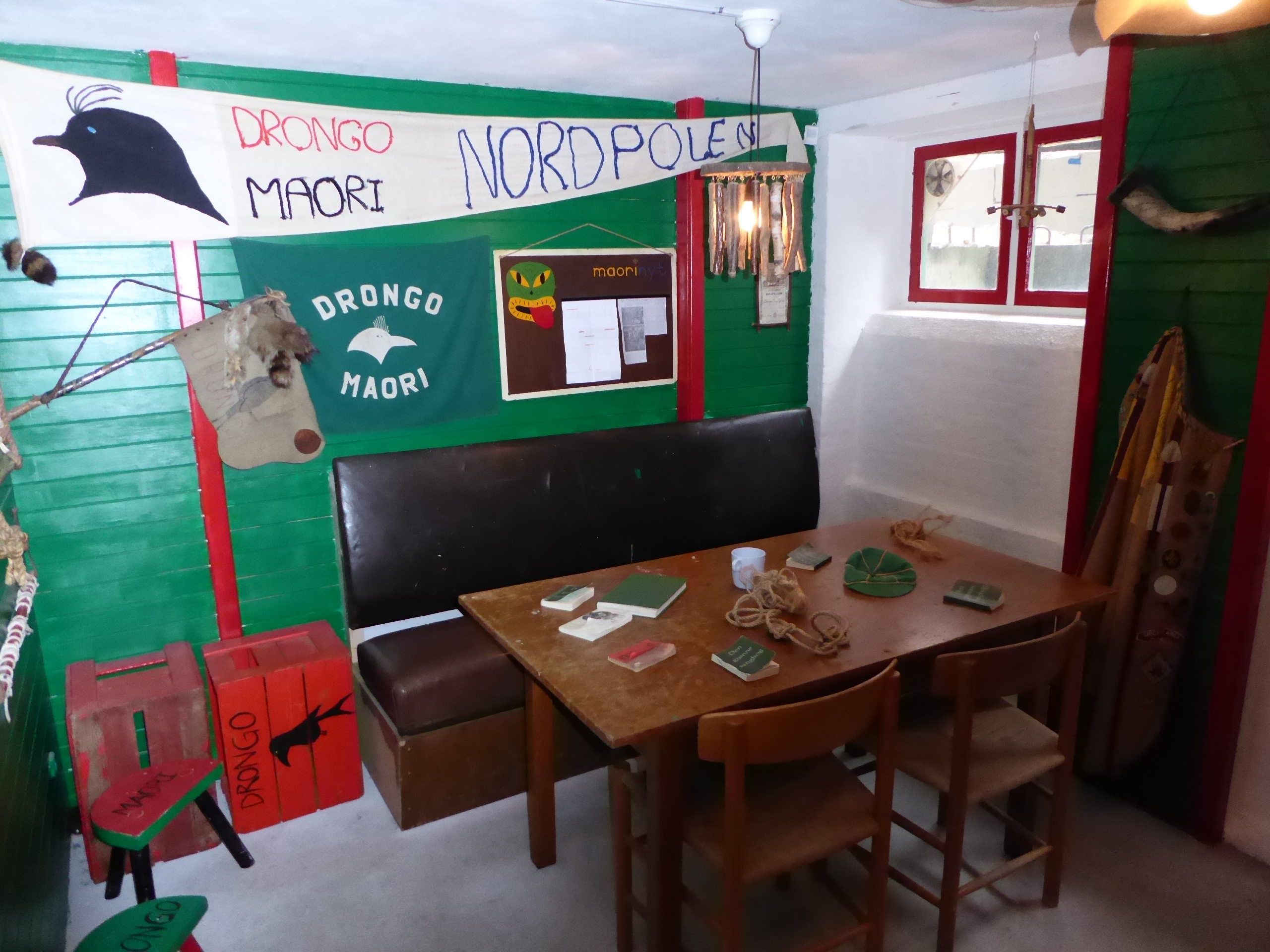
Interior of Scouts' club room in Aarhus, Denmark

== See also ==
- Boy Scout Building (Pensacola, Florida)
