= Sea Scouts New Zealand =

Part of The Scout Association of New Zealand

The Scout Association of New Zealand, Sea Scouts
- Country: New Zealand
- Founded: 1923
- Founder: The Boy Scouts Association (of the United Kingdom)
- Website http://www.scouts.org.nz/ABOUTUS/SeaScouts.aspx

The Scout Association of New Zealand's Sea Scouts are Scout Groups specialising in water-based activities. In 2017, there were around 900 Sea Scouts in New Zealand in 53 troops around the country.

The New Zealand Sea Scouts use a 17-foot cutter as their principal boat – the concept of having a specific boat for Sea Scouts in New Zealand originated in 1944. The first two boats of this class were ready for the 1st National Dominion Regatta in 1945. The original boats were clinker built and used kauri as the main timber. The rig was a gunter designed so that all the spars could be stowed inside the boat for towing. These wooden cutters are still in use, including the first built. They continued to be built in the original manner until the early 1970s; around 140 were built over this period. In the late 1960s and early 1970, fibreglass versions of the cutters began to be produced, the hull being identical in shape and size but the gunter rig was replaced with a Bermudan design using aluminium mast and boom. These boats are still in production and around 90 have been built.

== National regattas ==
National Sea Scout regattas take place every three years. The activities and competitions typically run for 9–10 days. The Premier Award is the Jellicoe Trident which was presented in 1924 by the Governor-General of New Zealand, Admiral of the Fleet, Viscount Jellicoe.

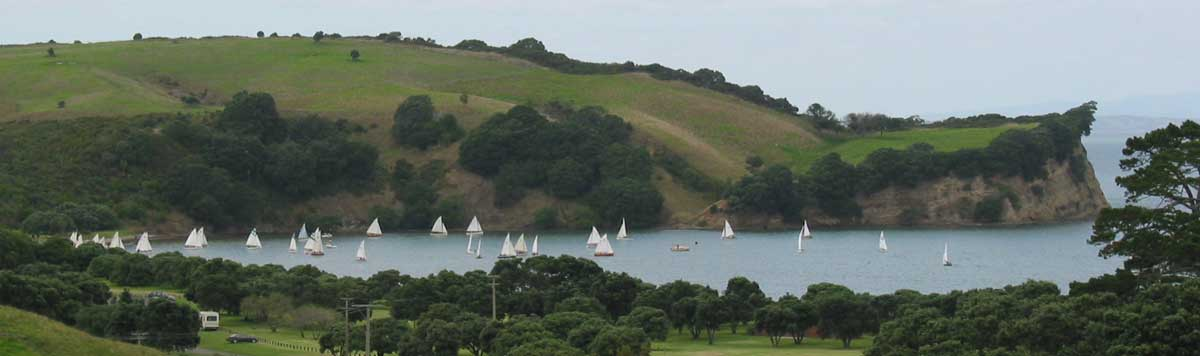
A view of a NZ Sea Scout Regatta

- 1924 Christchurch - Jellicoe Trident Award winners: Iron Duke Sea Scouts Nelson
- 1930 Petone - The runners up in the Jellicoe Trident Award were the "Irresistible" Sea Scout Group,
- 1945 Picton, New Zealand
- 1947 Tauranga – Jellicoe Trident Award winners: Takitimu Sea Scout Group, Gisborne tied
- 1949 Nelson, New Zealand – Jellicoe Trident Award winners: Takitimu Sea Scout Group, Gisborne tied
- 1951 Auckland (Motuihe Island) –
- 1953 Southland Region –
- 1955 Gisborne – Jellicoe Trident Award winners: Takitimu Sea Scout Group, Gisborne
- 1957 Ngatitoa Domain, Paremata, Wellington – Jellicoe Trident Award winners:Te Ara o Kiwa Sea Scouts, Southland
- 1959 Auckland –
- 1961 Akaroa –
- 1963 9th Dominion Regatta Auckland, Motutapu Island – Jellicoe Trident Award winners: Takitimu Sea Scout Group, Gisborne
- 1965 Ngatitoa Domain, Paremata, Wellington – Jellicoe Trident Award winners: Shackleton Sea Scout Group, Whangārei
- 1967 Lake Waihola, Dunedin – Jellicoe Trident Award winners: Iron Duke Sea Scouts Nelson
- 1969 Kaiapoi –
- 1971 Whangārei –
- 1973 Wellington – (14th National Regatta) Jellicoe Trident Award winners: St James Sea Scout Group, Petone, Lower Hutt
- 1975 Tokoroa –
- 1977 Lake Waihola, Dunedin – Jellicoe Trident Award winners: Britannia Sea Scout Group, Evans Bay, Wellington
- 1979 Picton, New Zealand –
- 1981 Hastings, New Zealand –
- 1983 Auckland (Whangaparaoa Peninsula) – Jellicoe Trident Award Winners: Pegasus Sea Scout Group, South Brighton, Christchurch
- 1985 Timaru - Jellicoe Trident Award Winners: Pegasus Sea Scout Group, South Brighton, Christchurch
- 1988 Tauranga –
- 1991 Evans Bay, Wellington – (22nd National Regatta) Jellicoe Trident Award winners: Westshore Sea Scout Group Napier
- 1994 Picton, New Zealand – (23rd National Regatta)
- 1997 Takapuna, Auckland, –
- 2006 Auckland, Motutapu Island – Jellicoe Trident Award winners: New Lynn Sea Scout Group, Auckland
- 2012 Christchurch, Lyttelton- Jellicoe Trident Award winners: New Lynn Sea Scout Group, Auckland
- 2015 Takapuna, Auckland (27th National Regatta) – Jellicoe Trident Award winners: New Lynn Sea Scout Group, Auckland
- 2017 Porirua, Wellington (28th National Regatta) – Jellicoe Trident Award winners: Iron Duke Sea Scouts Nelson
- 2024 Porirua, Wellington (29th National Regatta) Jellicoe Trident Award winners: New Lynn Sea Scout Group -- Overall Award winners: Kōtuku - St James Sea Scout Group

== 1st Waiheke Sea Scouts ==
The 1st Waiheke Sea Scouts is a group affiliated to the New Zealand Scouts Association. The Waiheke Sea Scouts group has several sections including; Kea (ages 6–8), Cubs (ages 8–11), Scouts (ages 11–14) and Venturers (ages 14–18). The younger members of the troop tend to focus on camping, indoor activities, bush walks and beach visits, while the older groups tend more to the sailing and water sports activities.

The Waiheke Sea Scouts Den is based on the shores of Putiki Bay, Ostend, Waiheke Island being built in 1956. This group was once one of the largest groups in the Auckland Region over the period 1960–1976. After Scouting membership reduced during the 1990's and 2000's, the run-down, partially derelict scout hall in its waterfront location was to be found with smashed windows and litter, missing gear and old scout cutters. From 2005, Skipper and scout master Graham Crooks and Upper North island regional manager Ian Nicolson, worked on renovating the hall and scout cutters. Following a major storm in 2024 that damaged the hall, the Group and local community commenced a restoration project while keeping the troop operational.

== Kōtuku Sea Scout Group ==
The Kōtuku Sea Scout Group is based in Levin, New Zealand, in the Horowhenua. The Group consists of a Kea, Cub, Scout Troop and Venturers. Training waters are primarily the Manawatu River at Matakarapa. The troop sailed and rowed for many decades on Punahau / Lake Horowhenua but stopped after a rāhui was placed on the lake in 2025. The troop also visits the estuary at Foxton Beach, locations over the Ohau river, Forest Lakes, and competes in the regattas of the Lower North Island Sea Scouts.

== Britannia Sea Scouts ==
The Britannia Sea Scouts is based in Wellington, New Zealand. They have a Kea, Cub, Scout and Venturer troop. They sail and row in Evans Bay, Wellington. This troop was created in 1927 and is the only Sea Scout troop in New Zealand to have a pennant on their scarf.

== Saint James Sea Scouts ==
The Saint James Sea Scouts are based at the Hikoikoi Reserve at the Hutt River mouth, Petone, Lower Hutt. New Zealand. The group began in 1938 and became Sea Scouts in 1955. The first boat shed was built from old car cases on the former Petone tip. (The Group's nickname of River Rats in part stems from the many rats on the site, but chiefly it comes from a comment of the National Water Advisor (1973) Sandy Bell when presenting the Jellicoe Trident to the Group "The sewer rats have cleaned out all the family silver". ) This area has since been converted into a reserve by the Hutt City Council and in 1991 the administration building of Te Omanga Hospice (known as Viard House in the past) was purchased and moved onto a site, just behind the old boat shed, which was demolished. The new Building provided a hall, storage and other rooms upstairs, and a boat deck downstairs. The group has a Kea Club, a Cub Pack, a Scout Troop and a Venturer Unit. The photo shows Scouts returning after a Sunday afternoon sail.

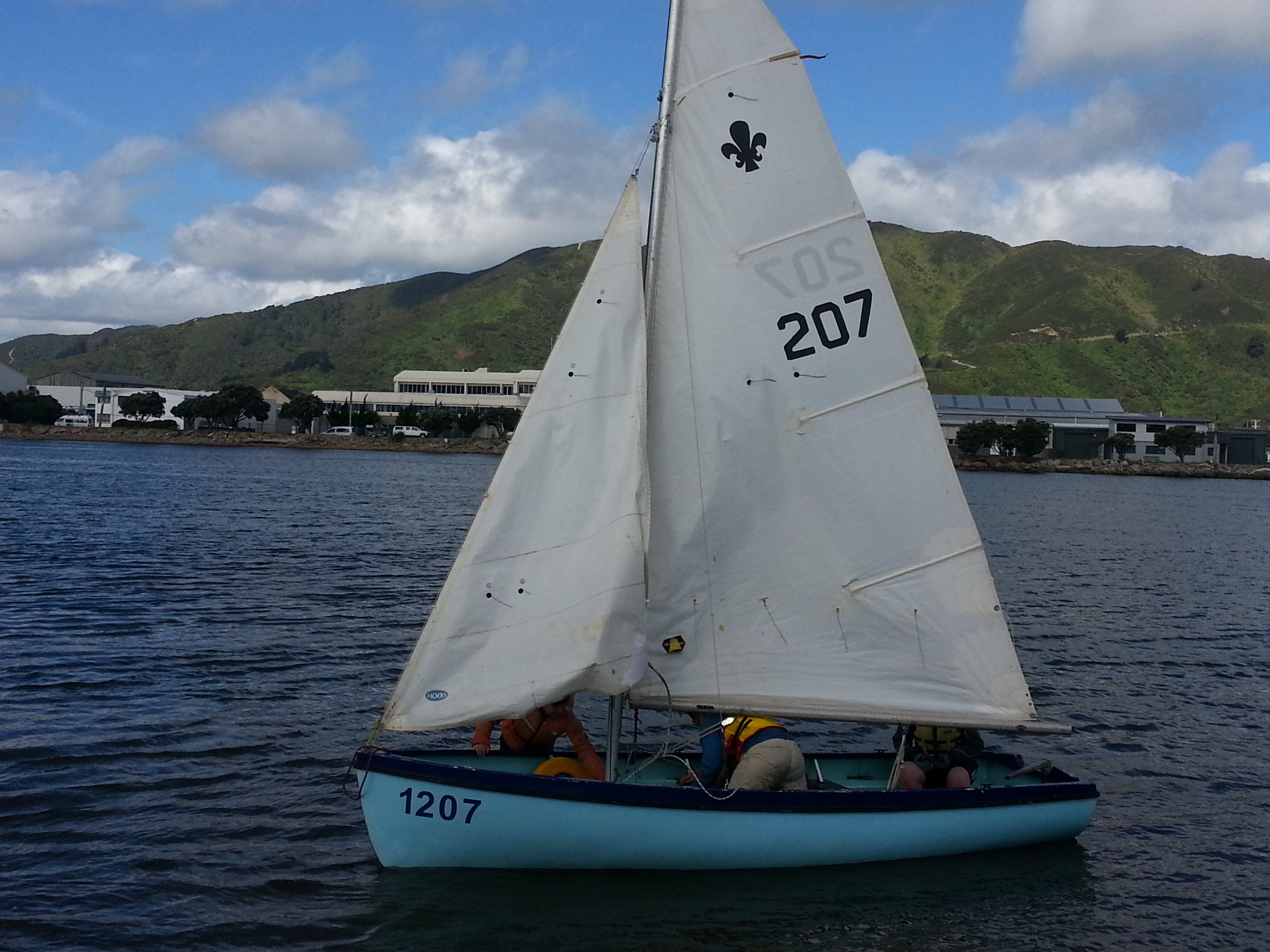

== Hawke Sea Scouts ==
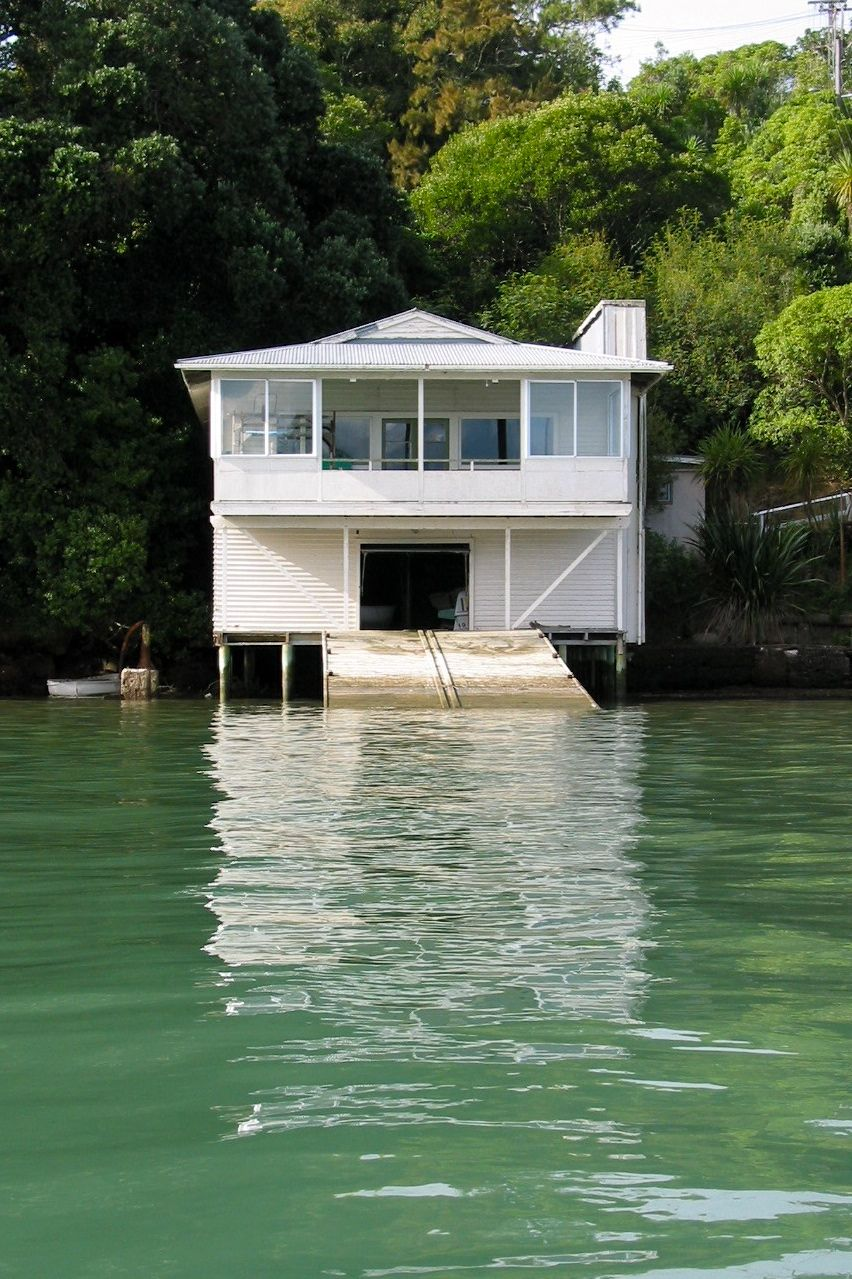
Hawke Scout hall

The Hawke Sea Scouts is located on the edge of Coxs Bay, which is between the suburbs of Herne Bay and Westmere in Auckland, New Zealand. They have a Kea, Cub, Scout and Venturer troop. The Hawke Sea Scout Hall was first established in January 1928. The Hawke Sea Scout Hall, locally called "The Ship," was a boat shed erected at the foot of Jervois Road on a reserve vested by special legislation. As the group grew in size a hall was built over the top of the old boat shed in 1943. On 21 July 1952 a fire swept through the building. In addition to the almost total loss of the building, the White Ensign flown by the NZ cruiser HMNZS Achilles during the Battle of the River Plate and at the Surrender of Japan at the end of World War II was lost in the fire. The new and current building was opened on Saturday 17 October 1953 by Sir John Allum.
