= Meola Reef =

Lava flow in Auckland, New Zealand

Coordinates: 36.842930°S 174.712616°E

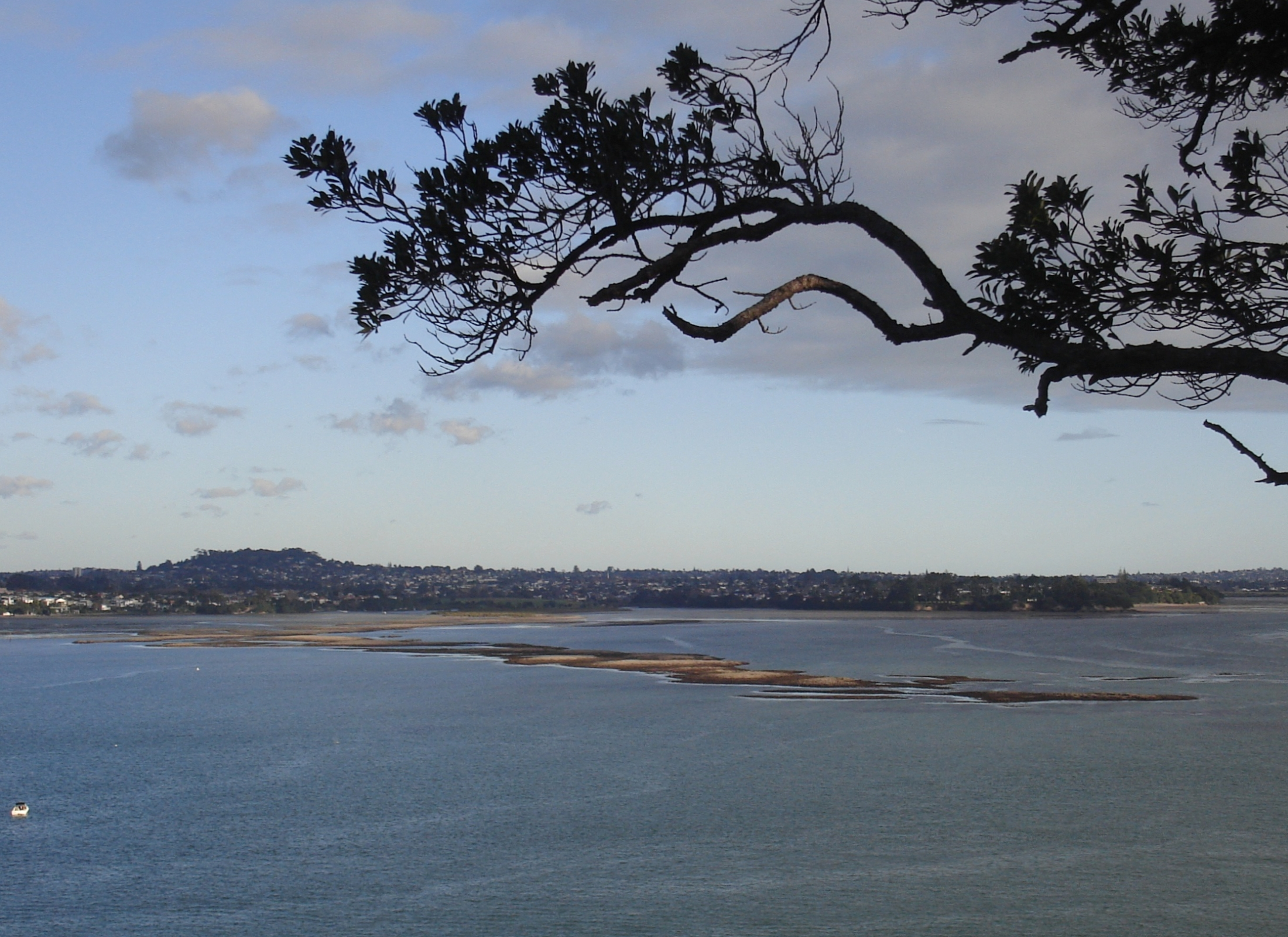
Te Tokaroa Reef, looking south from Kauri Point, near Kendall Bay, North Shore

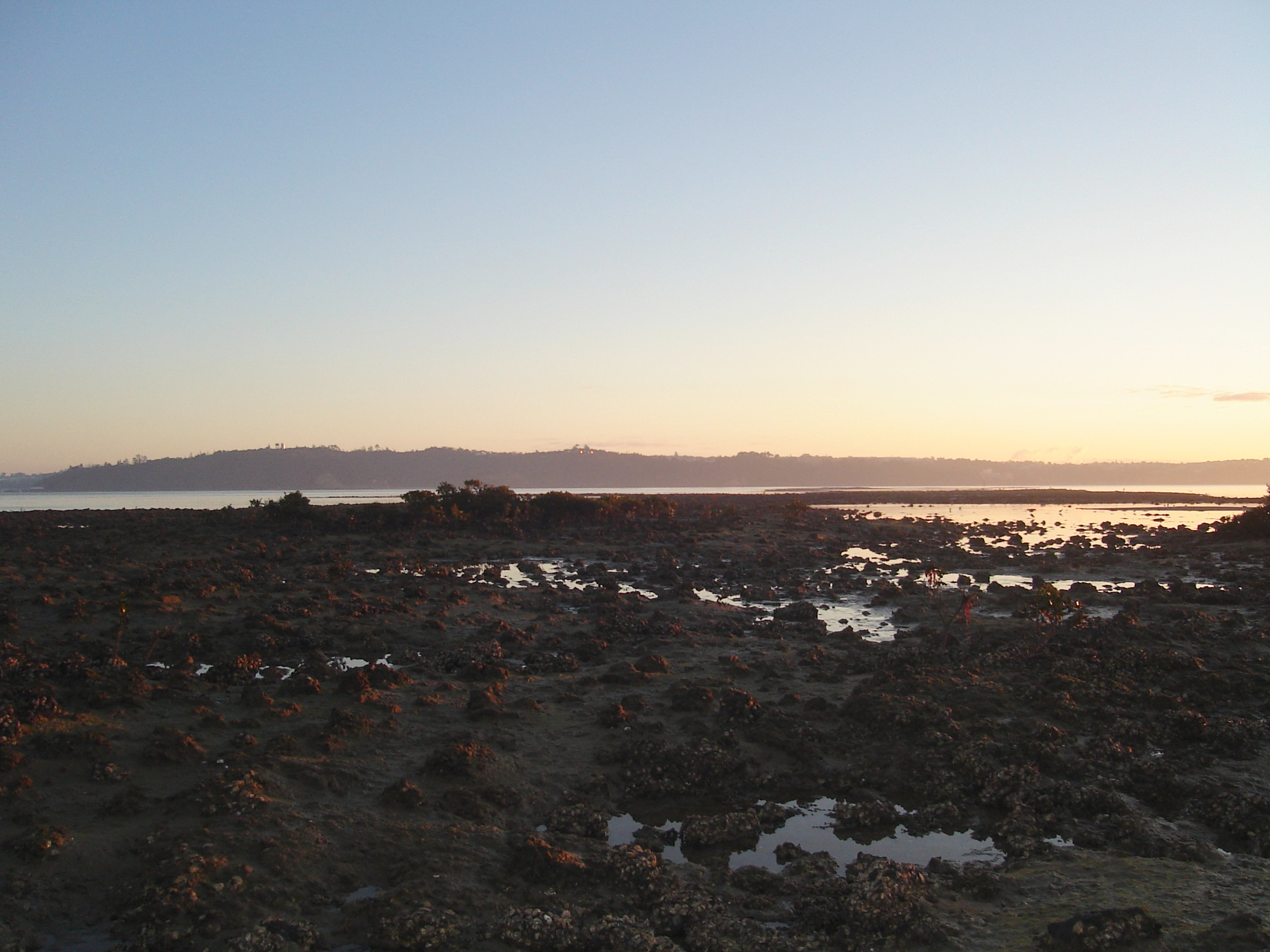
Te Tokaroa Reef, looking north

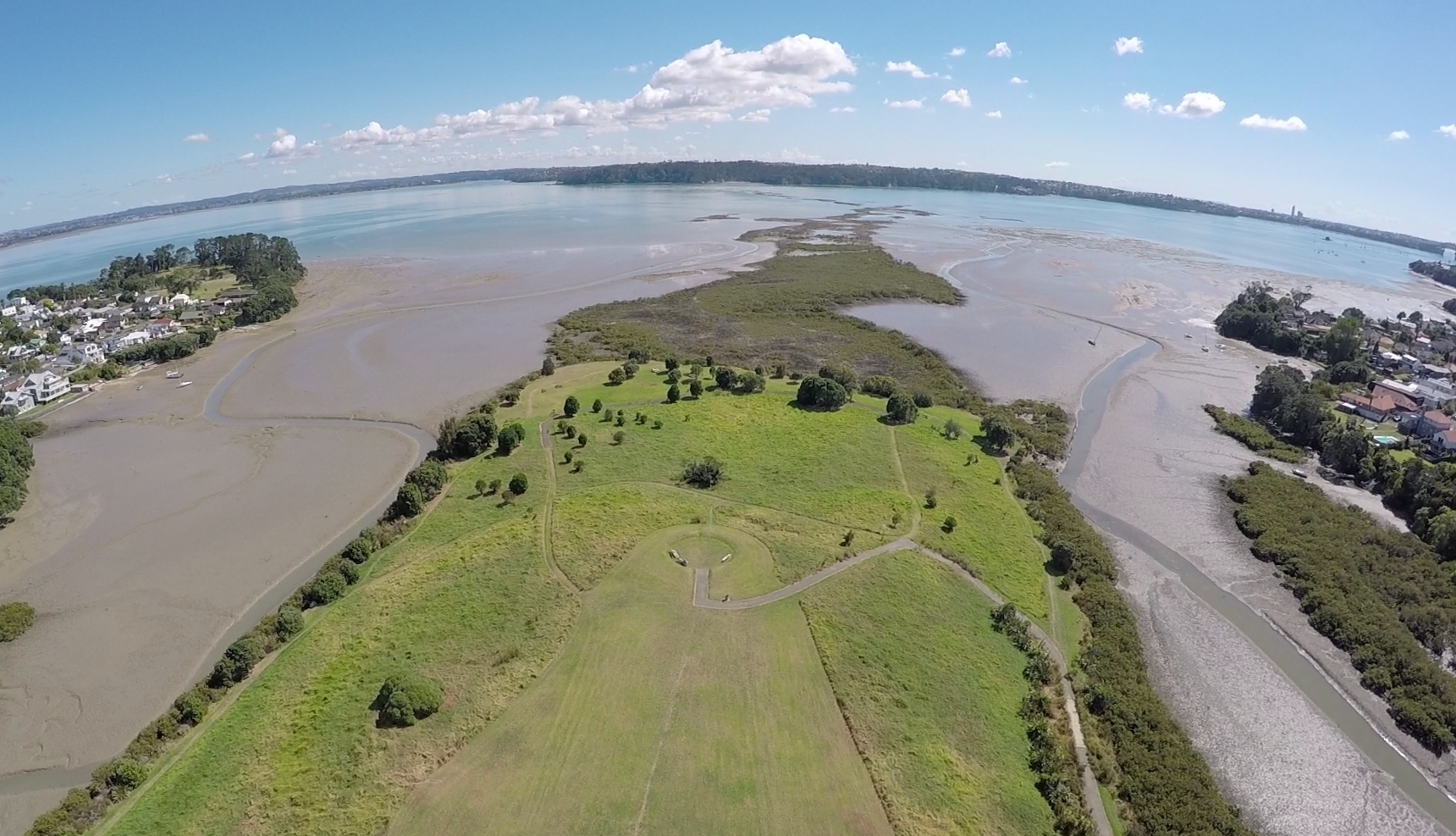
Te Tokaroa Reef, looking from above at Meola Reef Reserve

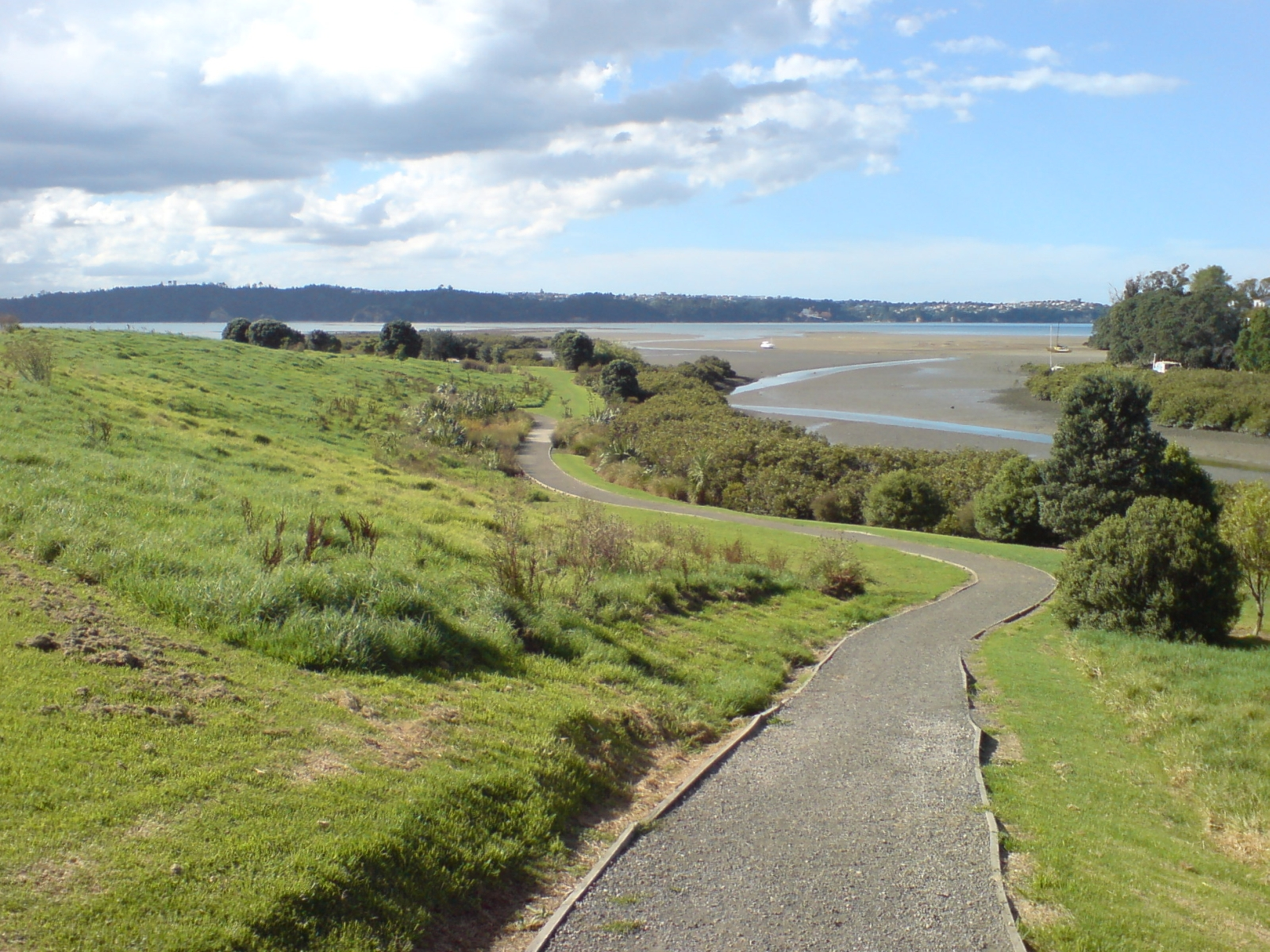
Looking along the line of the reef into the harbour

Meola Reef, officlally Te Tokaroa Reef ('toka'='rock', 'roa'='long'), is a lava flow forming a reef peninsula across part of Auckland's Waitemata Harbour, New Zealand. The reef extends for over 2 kilometres across the harbour, to within 500 metres of Kauri Point on the northern shore.

== Geography and natural history ==
The reef was formed more than 28,000 years ago from the final portion of an 11 kilometre lava flow that originated from Mount Saint John volcano. Until 2008 it was believed the lava had flowed from Te Tatua-a-Riukiuta volcano, but geochemical analyses that year revealed that the lava matched that of Mount Saint John. The route of the lava flow had been disguised by Maungawhau / Mount Eden, which had later erupted through it.

Located between the Point Chevalier and Westmere suburbs and protecting the calm waters of Coxs Bay, the reef is easily seen in the west from the Auckland Harbour Bridge at low tide, when much of it lies exposed. The best viewpoint is at Kauri Point, the headland to the east of Kendall Bay. The portion of the reef close to shore is covered by mangroves, and further out the rocks are covered by rock oysters, then bare. Strong footwear is needed to walk on the lava.

== History ==
The reef had two traditional names to Tāmaki Māori: Te Tokaroa ("The Long Reef") and Te Ara Whakapekapeka a Ruarangi ("The Perplexing Pathway of Ruarangi"). The reef was home to Spirobranchus fanworms until the 1960s, when Pacific oysters began displacing the fanworms. In the 1970s, plans for a Second Harbour Crossing from the reef to Birkenhead were shelved after public outcry.

Meola Reef was the site of the city's tip for many years. This has now been capped and replaced by a 15 ha public reserve, with mangrove swamps in the streams and tidal salt marshes either side.

In the 1990s, a local community effort to plant native trees on the reserve began. Since its establishment as a reserve, much of the Meola Reef became a fully fenced off-leash dog park.
