= Peta Mathias =

New Zealand food writer

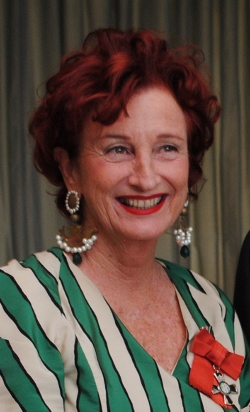
Mathias in 2017

Peta Christine Mathias MNZM is a New Zealand food writer and television show presenter and owns a television production company that produces food and travel shows. She is also known for leading gastronomic tours in the south of France, Morocco, Spain and India.

== Biography ==
Mathias was born in Auckland. She initially trained as a nurse and worked at Auckland Hospital for five years. She then moved to Canada, where she lived for six years in Montreal and Vancouver working as a toxicotherapist in drug and alcohol treatment centres. Mathias then moved to London and to Paris and started working in restaurants, first as a dishwasher and later as a chef; eventually she bought a restaurant there, Rose Blues, and ran it for four years.

In 1990, Mathias returned to New Zealand and began to work in food writing and broadcasting. In 2006 she set up a company organising and leading culinary tours, and in 2008 she set up a production company, Red Head Media, to make food and travel television shows based on her travels.

=== Publications ===
- Fête Accomplie (1995, 2014); Random House New Zealand; ISBN 978-1-77553-741-0
- Don't Get Saucy With Me, Béarnaise (1996); Random House New Zealand ISBN 978-1-86941-305-7
- Salut! (1998); Random House New Zealand; ISBN 978-1-86941-332-3
- Burnt Barley (2000), Vintage New Zealand; ISBN 1-86941-427-6
- Insatiable (2000); Random House New Zealand; ISBN 978-1-86941-444-3
- Sirocco (2002), Vintage New Zealand; ISBN 978-1-86941-520-4
- Noodle Pillows (2003), Exisle Publishing; ISBN 978-0-908988-48-8
- A Cook's Tour Of New Zealand (2005), Penguin Books New Zealand; ISBN 978-0-670-04560-0
- French Toast (published 1998 as Salut!; updated 2016, 2010), Penguin Books New Zealand; ISBN 978-0-670-04560-0
- Can We Help It If We're Fabulous? (2008), Penguin Books New Zealand; ISBN 978-0-14-300804-0
- A Matter of Taste with Fulvio Bonavia (2008), Hachette Australia; ISBN 978-0-7336-2353-0
- Just In Time To Be Too Late (2009), Penguin Books New Zealand; ISBN 9780143202462
- Culinary Adventures in Marrakech (2010), Penguin Books New Zealand; ISBN 9780143204596
- Beat Till Stiff (2011), Penguin Books New Zealand; ISBN 9780143566700
- Hot Pink Spice Saga with Julie Le Clerc (2014), Penguin Books New Zealand; ISBN 9781775535157
- Never Put All Your Eggs in One Bastard (2016), Penguin Books New Zealand; ISBN 9781775533870
- Eat Your Heart Out (2019), Penguin Books New Zealand; ISBN 978-0-14-377293-4
- Shed Couture (2021), Penguin Books New Zealand; ISBN 978-0-14-377305-4

=== Awards and recognition ===
In 1997, Mathias won Best Segment in a Food Program at the World Food Media Awards for her segment on TVNZ's series Taste NZ. In 2003, she won the Supreme Award at the New Zealand Guild of Food Writers Culinary Quill Awards. In the 2012 Queen's Birthday and Diamond Jubilee Honours Mathias was appointed a Member of the New Zealand Order of Merit for services as an author and television presenter.

Her book Burnt Barley won Best Literary Food Writing (in English) category at the World Cookbook Fair. The book was released with an accompanying four-track CD of the same name (released on the Vintage label), on which Mathias sings Irish country songs.

In 2014, Hot Pink Spice Saga, which Mathias co-wrote with Julie Le Clerc, was shortlisted in the Best in the World for Indian Cookery category at the Gourmand World Cookbook Awards.
