= Julie Le Clerc =

Julie Le Clerc is a New Zealand food writer, chef, former cafe owner and caterer and a presenter on TV food shows.

== Biography ==
Le Clerc grew up in the Auckland suburb of Westmere. Her mother Loraine made and iced wedding cakes as a cottage industry, and Le Clerc showed an early interest in food. After some years travelling overseas and exploring new cuisines, Le Clerc returned to Auckland and took lessons at the Le Cordon Bleu school in Parnell. She was soon asked to teach at the institute, and she also opened a catering company.

Le Clerc opened her first cafe with her sister Helen, called Byzantium, and located on Auckland's Ponsonby Road. Her second cafe was the Garnet Road Food Store, in Westmere, just along the road from where she grew up. She then left the cafe business to work on developing recipes and writing cookbooks. She has written for Cuisine, Viva, Next magazine, and the NZ Woman's Weekly, and has had her own magazine. She is now the food editor at NZ House & Garden magazine. Le Clerc has published 15 cookbooks. She has also presented TV3's cooking show Cafe Secrets for two seasons. Le Clerc occasionally holds cooking classes and demonstrations throughout New Zealand.

In 2016, Le Clerc spent six months in India as a consulting chef to The Lodhi Hotel, New Delhi. returning a year later for another 6 months.

=== Awards and recognition ===
In 2005, Le Clerc's book Made in Morocco: A Journey of Exotic Tastes and Places won the Readers' Choice Award at the Montana New Zealand Book Awards. In 2007, her book Taking Tea in the Medina won both Book of the Year at the New Zealand Guild of Food Writers Culinary Quill Awards, and Best Soft Cover Recipe Book at the World Food Media Awards.

In 2014, Hot Pink Spice Saga, which Le Clerc co-wrote with Peta Mathias, was shortlisted in the Best in the World for Indian Cookery category at the Gourmand World Cookbook Awards.
