= Herne Bay, New Zealand =

Herne Bay
- Suburb
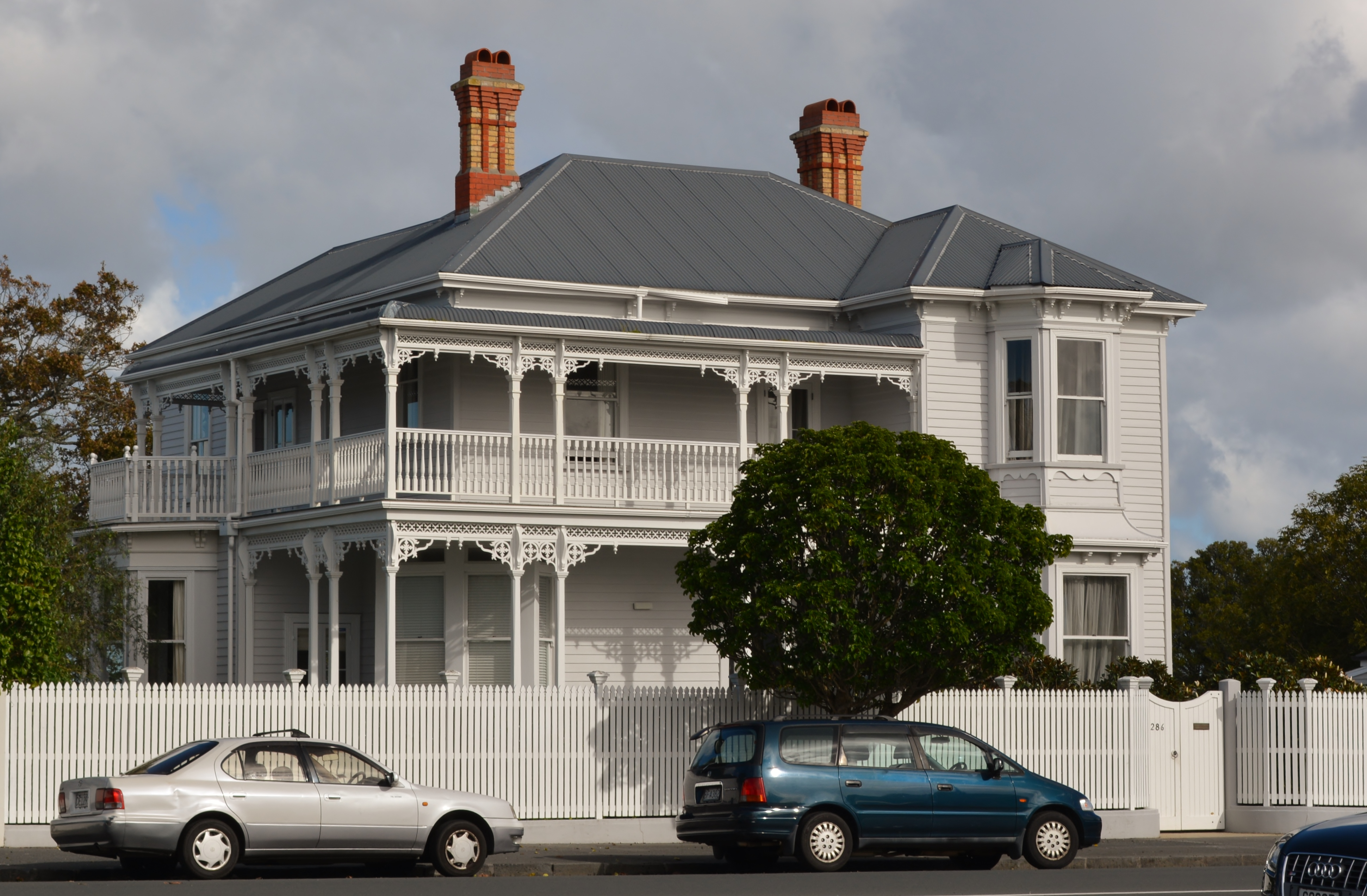
- A large wooden house on Jervois Road, in a style typical of Herne Bay.
- Interactive map of Herne Bay
- Coordinates: 36°51′S 174°44′E
- Country: New Zealand
- City: Auckland
- Local authority: Auckland Council
- Electoral ward: Waitematā and Gulf ward
- Local board: Waitematā Local Board

Area
  - Land: 88 ha (220 acres)

Population (June 2025)
  - Total: 2,830
  - Density: 3,200/km^{2} (8,300/sq mi)

Waitematā Harbour	Waitematā Harbour
Westmere, Coxs Bay	Herne Bay	Saint Marys Bay
Coxs Bay	Ponsonby, Grey Lynn

Herne Bay /hɜːrn/ is a suburb of Auckland, New Zealand. Located on the southwestern shore of the Waitematā Harbour to the west of the Auckland Harbour Bridge, it is known for its extensive harbour views, marine villas and Edwardian age homes. Herne Bay has been a prosperous area since the 1850s due to its outlook over the Waitemata Harbour. It ranked as the most expensive suburb in New Zealand in 2015. In 2021 it again topped rankings of the most expensive suburbs in New Zealand, with a median property value of $3.25 million.

Herne Bay is under the local governance of Auckland Council.

== History ==
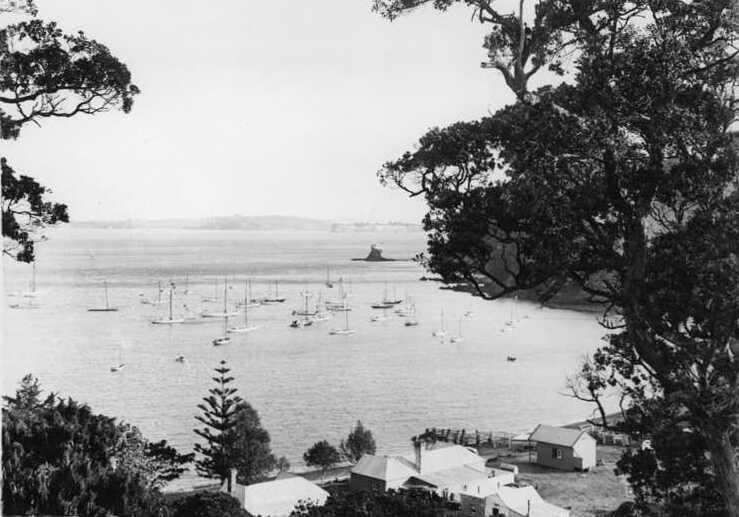
The Herne Bay Yacht Club picnic in 1900

The suburb is named after Herne Bay, a fashionable but respectable seaside resort in English county of Kent.

From the 1850s onwards it became apparent that Auckland's Herne Bay was quite handy to the centre of town by a short boat trip. Herne Bay developed as an early commuter suburb and was the location of several large houses belonging to members of the professional classes. Most of these houses (termed 'marine villas') were readily accessible from the water, with their own jetties and boathouses - in some cases there was not any land route to them. Some of these early houses still exist, surrounded by later houses which were built as their large properties were subdivided around the turn of the 20th century.

Also located in this area on the shore of Ponsonby (between Argyle Street and the sea) was Kemp's Gardens. This was a popular pleasure resort for Auckland's people during the 1860s. The gardens were "complete with pavilion, gardens and illuminations": "A free hand was given, drinks were sold, music was provided and the least said the better". Later renamed "Cremorne Gardens" after the fashionable pleasure gardens in London, Kemp's gardens boasted a "Dancing Pavilion, ten acres of walks and sports grounds". It is remembered in the name "Cremorne Street".

=== Twenty-first century ===
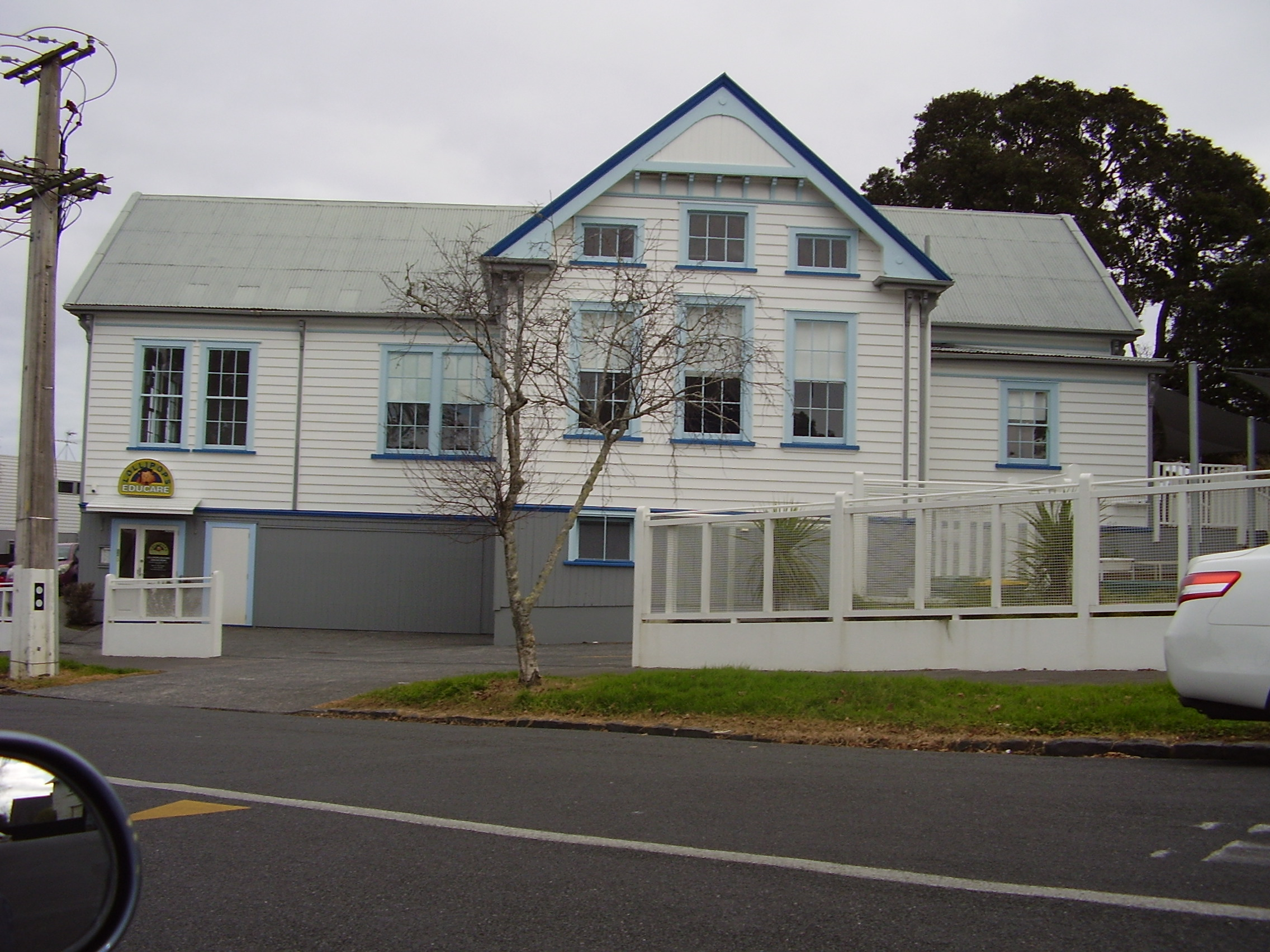
Constructed in 1894 the former Bayfield School is a category 1 building

In late 2008, Herne Bay became New Zealand's first "$2 million suburb", when the average house price surpassed the $2 million mark.

== Demographics ==
Herne Bay covers 0.88 km^{2} (0.34 sq mi) and had an estimated population of 2,830 as of June 2025, with a population density of 3,216 people per km^{2}.

Historical population
Year	Pop.	±% p.a.
2006	2,982	—
2013	2,940	−0.20%
2018	3,036	+0.64%
2023	2,775	−1.78%

Herne Bay had a population of 2,775 in the 2023 New Zealand census, a decrease of 261 people (−8.6%) since the 2018 census, and a decrease of 165 people (−5.6%) since the 2013 census. There were 1,326 males, 1,425 females and 21 people of other genders in 1,194 dwellings. 5.4% of people identified as LGBTIQ+. The median age was 47.6 years (compared with 38.1 years nationally). There were 387 people (13.9%) aged under 15 years, 450 (16.2%) aged 15 to 29, 1,377 (49.6%) aged 30 to 64, and 558 (20.1%) aged 65 or older.

People could identify as more than one ethnicity. The results were 90.9% European (Pākehā); 7.5% Māori; 1.9% Pasifika; 7.2% Asian; 2.6% Middle Eastern, Latin American and African New Zealanders (MELAA); and 1.4% other, which includes people giving their ethnicity as "New Zealander". English was spoken by 98.6%, Māori language by 1.2%, Samoan by 0.2%, and other languages by 13.8%. No language could be spoken by 0.8% (e.g. too young to talk). New Zealand Sign Language was known by 0.2%. The percentage of people born overseas was 24.6, compared with 28.8% nationally.

Religious affiliations were 30.8% Christian, 0.6% Hindu, 0.2% Islam, 0.1% Māori religious beliefs, 0.4% Buddhist, 0.6% New Age, 0.3% Jewish, and 1.3% other religions. People who answered that they had no religion were 60.5%, and 4.9% of people did not answer the census question.

Of those at least 15 years old, 1,224 (51.3%) people had a bachelor's or higher degree, 885 (37.1%) had a post-high school certificate or diploma, and 270 (11.3%) people exclusively held high school qualifications. The median income was $70,200, compared with $41,500 nationally. 873 people (36.6%) earned over $100,000 compared to 12.1% nationally. The employment status of those at least 15 was that 1,260 (52.8%) people were employed full-time, 354 (14.8%) were part-time, and 57 (2.4%) were unemployed.

== Schools ==
Bayfield School and Ponsonby Primary School are coeducational contributing primary schools (years 1-6) with rolls of 364 and 308 respectively, as of July 2026.

== Notable buildings ==
- Baptist Church, 43 Jervois Road. A wooden building in the Classical style. This church contains an organ reputed to be the oldest in Australasia, possibly used by Queen Charlotte at Windsor Castle or Kew Palace it was given by Queen Victoria to the St Paul's Church in Emily Place, here in Auckland. After that building was demolished and rebuilt on Symonds Street with a new big up-to-date organ this chamber organ made its way into the possession of the Baptist Church here.
- St Stephen's Presbyterian Church. Corner of Jervois Road and Shelly Beach Road. Wooden Gothic Church with impressive interior.
- Stichbury Terrace. Corner of Jervois Road and Curran Street. Neo-Classical Apartment Block from around 1915.
- Ponsonby Primary School. 44 Curran Street. The main building is an intact example of the Arts & Crafts style employed for educational facilities just around the First World War. Reinforced concrete construction with brick and stucco detailing, Marseilles tile roof and metal windows. Prior to 1920 this property was occupied by a Chinese Market Garden.
- Shangri-la Apartments. 97-103 Jervois Road. Late 1980s High-rise apartment block; this building contains a mere 16 apartments many of which occupy an entire floor.
- Turret House 4 Shelly Beach Road. Large Edwardian Mansion with a rooftop turret. Currently a bed and breakfast hotel.
- Westwater Apartments. 10 Shelly Beach Road. High rise apartment block from the 1980s.
- Dome House. 11 Shelly Beach Road (corner Cameron Street). Unusual large Edwardian house in the American Queen Anne Style - a landmark due to its large domed corner turret.
- Stebbing Recording Studios. 108-114 Jervois Road.
- Art-Deco Flats. 175-183 Jervois Road. Four apartment blocks built in the 1930s on land previously owned by the tram company.
- Former Bayfield School. 272 Jervois Road. Wooden Edwardian school now used for preschool activities. Typical example of the building created by the Ministry of Works for schools of the period.
- Sea Breeze Motel. 213 Jervois Road. Interesting example of 1950s exotica architecture.
- 286 Jervois Road. Large two storied Edwardian Italianate house. Recently restored.
- 235 Jervois Road. Arts & Crafts Cottage by Basil Hooper. Single storied wooden house from around 1928 by a prominent Arts & Crafts architect. Probably done in conjunction with the Chapman Taylor house next door. Wood, brick and Marseilles tile roof.
- Williamson House. 237 Jervois Road. Important 1928 Arts & Crafts house by Jame Walter Chapman Taylor for Francis H. Williamson. Two-storied masonry house with stucco facades, Marseilles tile roof and metal framed windows.
- Hawke Sea Scout Hall, 55 West End Road. First built in 1928 on this site, rebuilt 1952 after a fire in a vernacular site by local volunteers with timber donated by US Marine Corps. Recently restored in traditional style.
