= Coxs Bay =

Bay in the Auckland region of New Zealand

Opoututeka / Coxs Bay
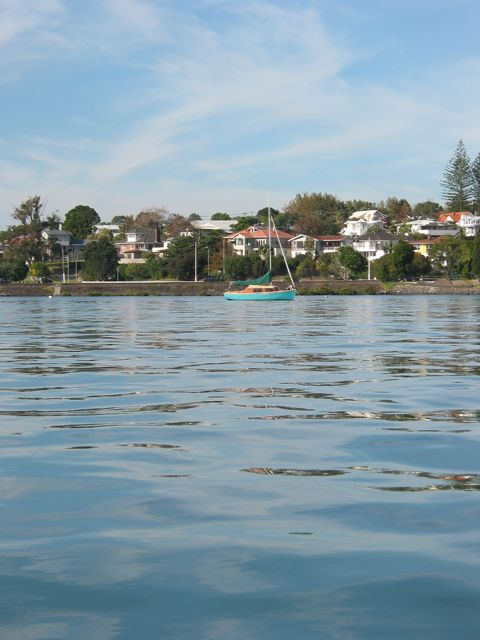
- Opoututeka (Coxs Bay), Auckland, NZ

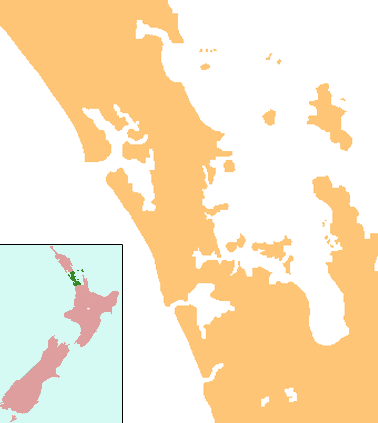
- Location within New Zealand Auckland
- Location: Waitematā Harbour
- Coordinates: 36.849917°S 174.725041°E
- River sources: Coxs Creek
- Basin countries: New Zealand
- Max. length: 1 km (0.62 mi)
- Max. width: 1 km (0.62 mi)
- Surface area: 1 km^{2} (0.39 mi^{2})
- Average depth: .2 metres (0.66 ft)

Coxs Bay or Opoututeka is a bay located in the Waitematā Harbour, within the Auckland region of New Zealand. It is situated between the settlements of Westmere to the southwest and Herne Bay to the northeast, with Grey Lynn to the southeast. The bay is protected from the west by Te Tokoroa/Meola Reef, the end of one of the longest lava flows in the Auckland volcanic field.

== History ==
The bay, creek and surrounding land, with its extensive wetlands, food sources and flax, held significant importance for multiple iwi. Flax grown in the Coxs Bay gully was harvested, processed, and then dried on the north-facing hills in Herne Bay.

The first European land purchase in the area around Coxs Bay occurred in 1840. The western boundary of this land was marked by Opoutukeha (generally known as Opou for short) or Coxs Creek. In 1841, John and Jane Cox applied for a squatter's license for the land next to the bay and creek, from which the European name for the Creek and Bay originated. They built a dwelling and established a market garden on this land.

In 1859, the area then known as Richmond, situated between Edgars and Coxs Creek, was subdivided into lots. The streets now known as Regina, Kingsley, Livingstone, Webber, and Edgars (formerly Queen, King, Stanley, Webber, and Victoria) were laid out, and logs for the early houses were floated up Coxs Creek and pit-sawn on site.

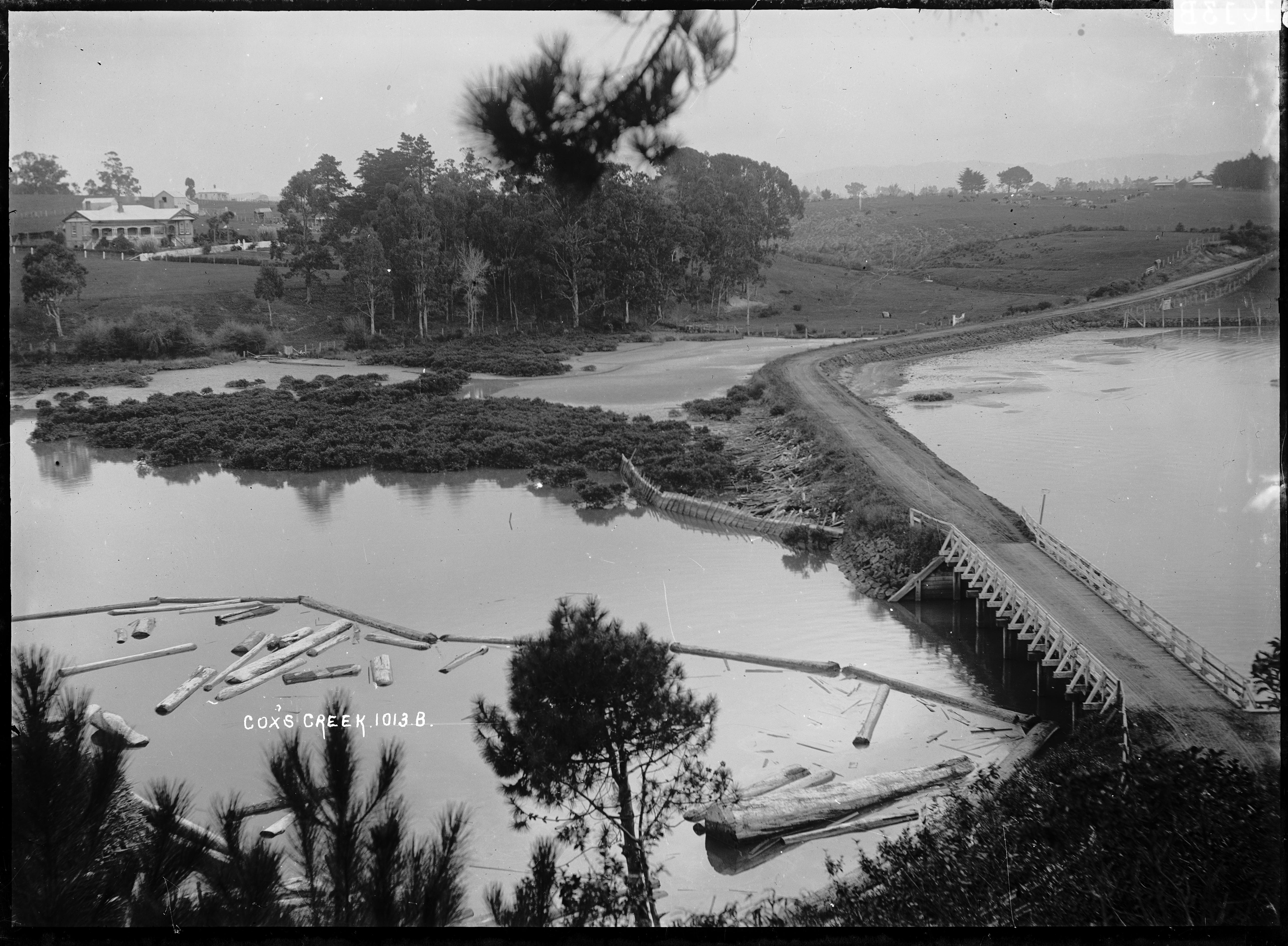
Logs at Cox's Creek, ca. 1912

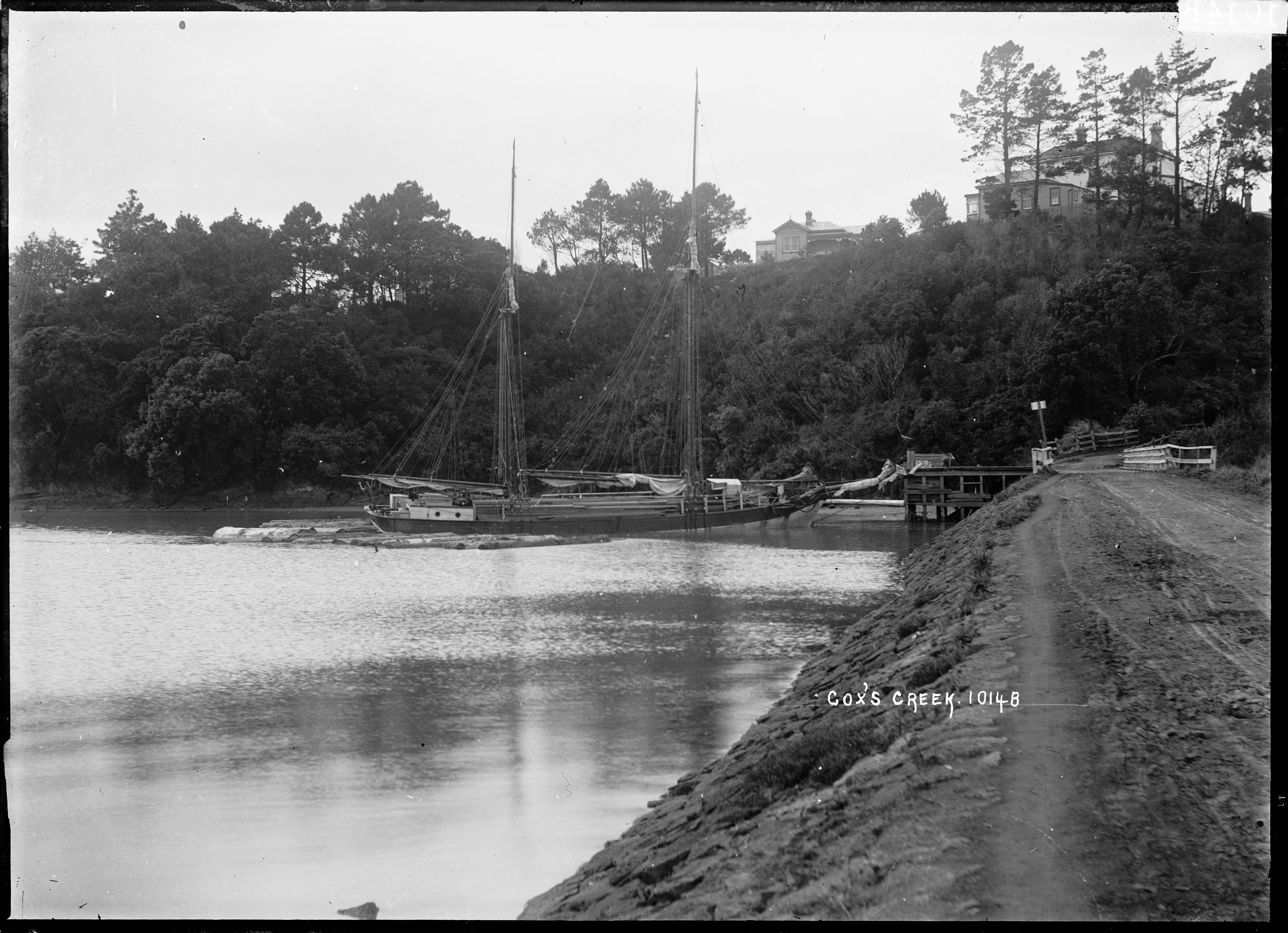
Yacht at Cox's Creek, ca. 1912

From 1860, there was significant industrial development in the area, this included the Willesden Works which produced pesticide, sulphuric acid for the manufacture of fertiliser and artificial stone. In 1865, a brick factory, Caledonian Brickworks, was established by John Leckie, and products were shipped via Coxs Creek to Auckland. In 1874, the Warnock brothers set up the Warnock Soap and Candle Works on the southern side of Richmond Rd, next to Coxs Creek. In 1899, Cashmore Brothers established a steam-powered sawmill beside the creek below Coxs Bridge Rd (later renamed West End Rd). The bay and creek were used for the transport of logs and timber. Despite strong protests from the growing local population, the mill operated until 1920, when it accidentally burnt down, leaving sawdust and timber smoldering for over a year.

The bridge over Coxs Creek, connecting Westmere and Herne Bay, was first recorded in 1881, then demolished in 1885 and rebuilt in 1886. The lower level of the Hawke Scout Hall, built in the late 1920s, remains an important part of the local community and a significant building in the area.

In 1938, a landslide deposited several tons of earth onto the road and Coxs Creek bridge. In January 2023, extensive flooding caused several landslides and a fallen tree, leading to the closure of West End Road.

== Present Day ==
Across West End Road from the Bay is Coxs Bay Reserve, a large park with sports fields for rugby and cricket. It is approximately 14 hectares, and there are several walking trails through the park.

Coxs Bay itself is considered unsuitable for swimming, collecting shellfish, and fishing due to poor water quality, and this is a special status due to either "a history of poor or highly variable water quality". It is a permanent no-swim notice, due to frequent wastewater spills. In 2007, Auckland City Council dredged the Creek to restore tidal flow and in 2013, Watercare Services Limited announced a $1 billion dollar project to intercept major overflows, that would make the Bay and Creek swimmable again. This project is scheduled to be completed in 2030.
