= Westmere, New Zealand =

Westmere
- Suburb
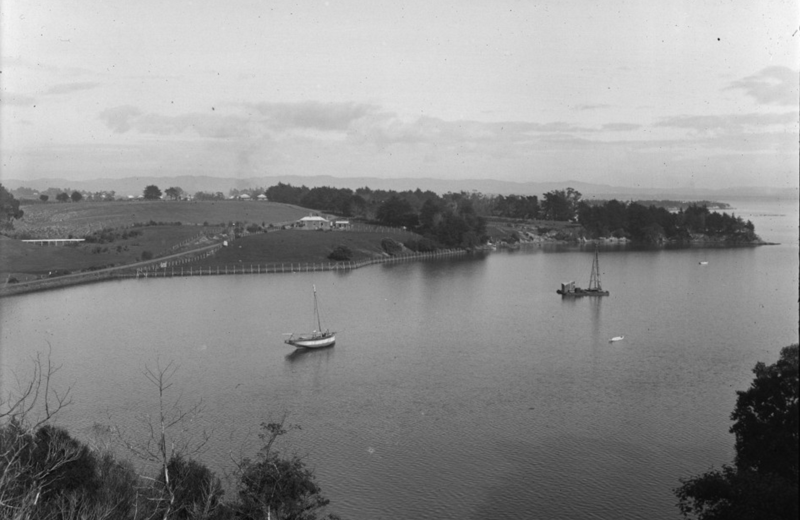
- Southwestwards view across Coxs Bay of Westmere, 1916
- Interactive map of Westmere
- Coordinates: 36.855°S 174.720°E
- Country: New Zealand
- City: Auckland
- Local authority: Auckland Council
- Electoral ward: Waitematā and Gulf ward
- Local board: Waitematā Local Board

Area
  - Land: 65 ha (160 acres)

Population (June 2025)
  - Total: 2,340
  - Density: 3,600/km^{2} (9,300/sq mi)
- Postcode: 1022

| (Waitematā Harbour) | (Coxs Bay, Waitematā) | Herne Bay, (Coxs Bay) |
| Point Chevalier | Westmere | Ponsonby |
| Point Chevalier | Western Springs | Grey Lynn |

Westmere is a residential suburb of Auckland, in northern New Zealand. The Auckland Council provides local governance. On the southern shore of the Waitematā Harbour, this former peninsula is by road about 6 kilometres (4 mi) west of the city centre.

== History ==
Prior to the arrival of Europeans in Auckland, Westmere and the surround suburbs of Herne Bay, Coxs Bay and Grey Lynn were frequent transit points for those journeying through Auckland and places with abundant local food sources and access to freshwater. There have been several middens found on the coast of Westmere that show access to a range of seafood. Additionally, Māori harvested flax from the wetlands of Coxs Bay (Opoutukeha or Opou) for processing elsewhere into rope and other fibres for clothes.

=== Early European settlement ===
Westmere was not part of the central Auckland land mass that gifted to the government in 1840, as Opoutukeha, Coxs Creek, was used as a boundary of the edge of that gift. Lots within what is now Westmere began to be auctioned off from 1844.

The thoroughfare along the ridge of Westmere was originally named Wolseley Rd and was renamed Garnet Rd in 1917. In 1886, Wolseley Rd was described as the main road, off which a side road would be extended to form the causeway to the new Coxs Creek bridge (completed in 1886) with an approach on the far side up to Jervois Rd. The previous bridge was funded by the government in 1881. However, it lacked approaches and it became merely a low tide trail connection facing ultimate removal.

In 1890, Lynton Lodge on William Denny Ave was built. Lynton Lodge has been a long-term care facility for most of its existence. Greenwood Ave, later renamed Larchwood Ave, and Peel St provided a Richmond Rd–Wolseley Rd connection by that time.

=== Early industry ===
Alongside the farms and market gardens in Westmere, from 1877 to 1908, there were several abattoirs and business working with meat by-products established. In 1877, the city abattoir opened upon a site, which was later developed as Notley St in 1940. In 1908, with the opening of a new city abattoir at Ōtāhuhu and considerable pressure on the council, this facility in Westmere closed.

In 1884, Bridgenorth Tannery was built on Old Mill Road. In 1885, the R. & W. Hellaby slaughterhouse and holding paddocks were identified as near Coxs Creek, probably bounded by Cox's Bridge Rd, later renamed West End Rd, and William Denny Ave. By 1891, D.S. Faulder also operated a slaughterhouse on his 11-hectare (26-acre) property. There were also smaller businesses, such as Alexander Donald's tannery and fellmongery on Livingstone Street.

From 1897, the city dumped refuse in a location bordering Meola Creek, which became the foot of Phelan St in 1940 (later eastern end of Meola Rd). By 1903, the site was deemed a menace to public health.

=== Initial subdivisions ===
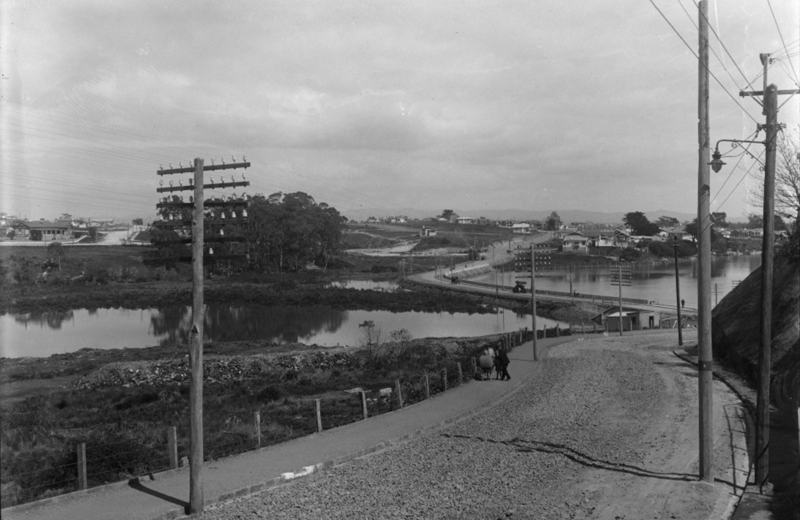
Westwards view along West End Rd across Coxs Creek to Westmere, 1926, showing the lake-like body of water created.

Part of Grey Lynn, the 1923 launching of the Westmere Estate (Nottingham St to Warwick Ave), on the central part of the peninsula, introduced the new name. Mere is a British English noun meaning lake. The causeway, later West End Road, created a lake-like body of water at Coxs Creek. The southern part of the peninsula, an older area, was considered the western portion of Richmond, until the mid-1920s, when the Westmere designation became more common.

The northern part, launched in 1916, often used its estate name and misidentified the location as Herne Bay, until the early 1930s, when Westmere became the norm. Most of the earliest housing was created for workers and tradespeople, and the housing adopted the Californian bungalow style of architecture.

Beginning in the mid-1920s, a landfill gradually created a causeway from the western end of Meola Rd towards Garnet Rd. The Westmere Estate Co launched the estate extension in 1925, comprising Westmere Cres, Oban Rd, and the adjacent part of Lemington Rd, and the Westmere Park Estate in 1926. That year, the West End Rd causeway was widened, footpaths added, and the one-lane wooden bridge replaced by a two-lane concrete structure.

In 1927, when St Cuthbert's Anglican Church Hall, 8 Faulder Ave, opened, the Sunday school soon numbered 104 children. Hosting community activities and a reasonably strong congregation until the 1950s, the building closed in 2007 and has since become a residence. From the same era, Dunnottar Hall, on the corner of Faulder Ave, remains in use.

The Great Depression in the 1930s saw several of the beachfront properties in Westmere remain unsold and those unsold in the 1925 extension of the Westmere Estate, were discounted by 25%. The West End Lawn Tennis Club was established in 1932. Later that decade, scattered state housing was built, and reclaiming the harbour at Westmere was considered for an airport site. In the late 1930s, Westmere was part of a major state housing programme.

Fires occurred on the Marsden & Co premises at the corner of Larchwood and Garnet Road in 1938 and 1945.

The West End Rd landfill existed 1950–1970s. In 1960, the building of a new bridge and roadway at Coxs Creek eased the road curve, the former road becoming a parking area. In the 1970s, the post office on the corner of Oban Rd was replaced by a new one-storey building to its rear. In the late 1980s, the post office closed as part of the sweeping changes to postal services. The building has since been modified into a two-storey residence.

The Meola Rd landfill continued until 1970, but the road connection was completed in 1950, linking Westmere to Point Chevalier, and the western suburbs with the city, and later that decade, with the new Auckland Harbour Bridge.

=== Modern history ===
By 2000, rising real estate prices had created a predominantly middle-class suburb. Location determines positioning in the range of upper to lower middle class. Harbour views are available for shoreline properties, many residences that have been raised to two-storeys, and some one-storey ones. Restaurants, cafés, takeaways, and a wine shop, augment various stores. Bordering to the east, Cox's Bay Reserve comprises Hukanui Reserve, Bayfield Park and Cox's Bay Park. The reserve features a boardwalk through the mangrove swamps, sports fields, and children's playgrounds. Bordering to the west is the MOTAT Aviation Hall and Meola Bay Reserve, covering the Meola Reef.

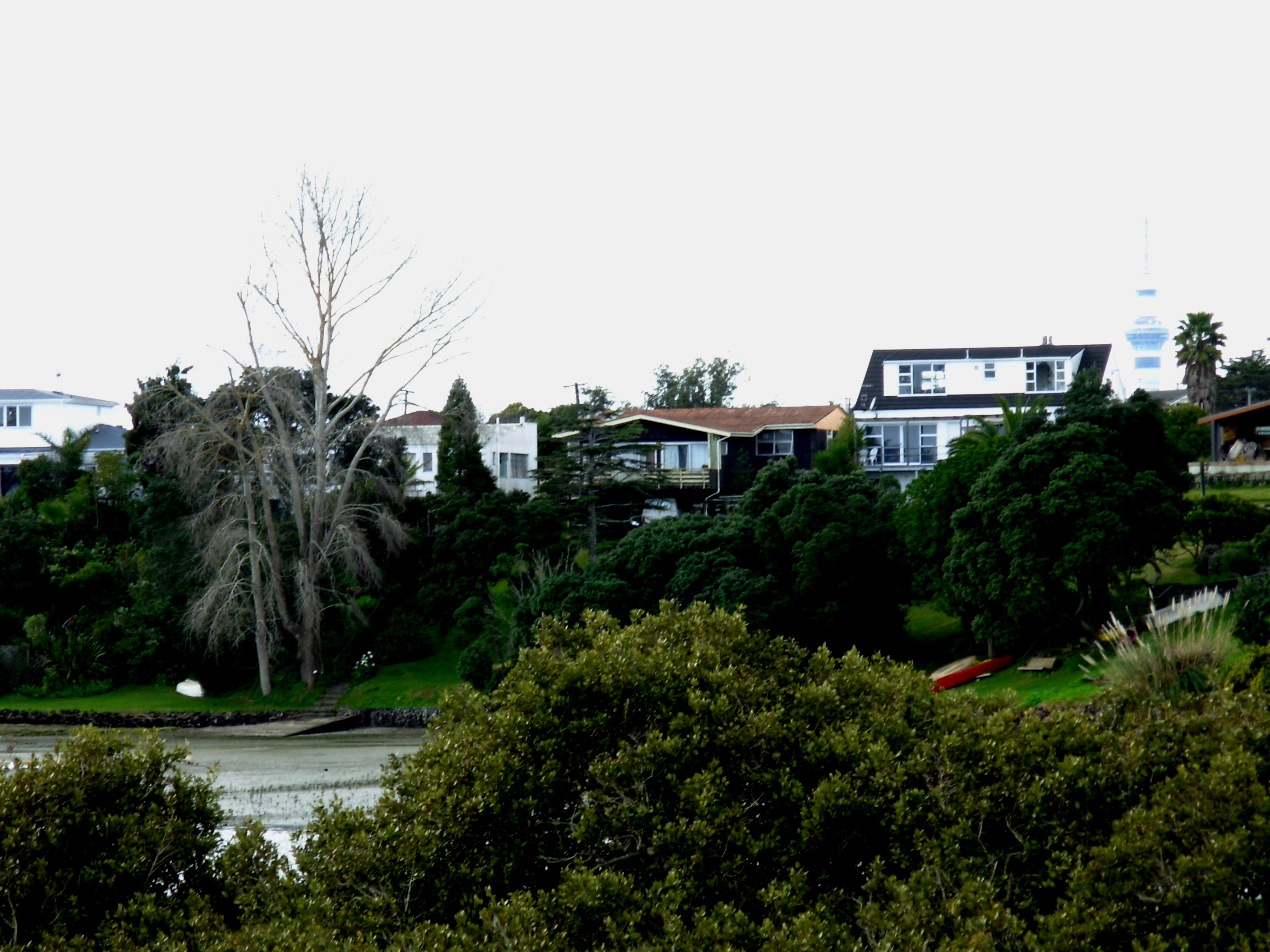
Eastwards view of Westmere from Meola Reef

In 2016, Westmere had the most expensive state house in the country, valued at $2.54 million. That year, the Weona–Westmere Coastal Walkway opened. The southeastern end is beside the scout hall built in the early 1960s.

Occupying two adjacent sections, 20 Rawene Ave was on the market intermittently for more than four years, before a 2020 sale by owners Tenby Powell and wife Sharon Hunter. The sales price was $17.68 million. The most expensive NZ home sale that year was also in Westmere, when Andrew Adamson sold his mansion to Anna Mowbray and Ali Williams for $24 million.

The suburb comprises about 1,700 homes and is a compact neighbourhood. The median real estate sales price was $1.8 million in 2019, increasing then falling to $2.4 million in 2023.

== Local governance ==
In the 1860s, Westmere was a part of Newton Borough, later the Grey Lynn Borough, which was divided into wards in 1887, Wolseley Rd (Garnet Rd) being in the Richmond Ward. In 1904, the Richmond Ward disappeared with the abolition of the ward system, and ten years later, in 1914, the Grey Lynn Borough merged into the Auckland City Council. In 2010, Auckland City Council was combined with six other city and district councils into Auckland Council, and Westmere now falls within the Waitematā and Gulf Ward.

== Schools ==
In 1882, the 2-hectare (5-acre) site was purchased. To relief pressure on neighbouring primary schools, the Richmond West School opened in July 1914. The brick building comprised three classrooms, a headmaster's office, and a staff room. At the time, no side streets existed west of Greenwood Ave (Larchwood). Consequently, the student body would have been drawn from that side, the school faced northeastward, and a wide curved pathway connected the building with that street. Over the next decade, rooms were added on the northwest side of the school and two classrooms were erected near the original Larchwood entry gate for the infant students. In 1930, the name changed to Westmere School to avoid confusion with the Richmond Road School. The school dental clinic was built on the south corner of the property. Apart from the school hall, the buildings were demolished in 1978. New buildings were erected along Garnet Rd and Larchwood Ave (spanning the former school gully). The old hall was demolished by 2008 and the new one opened in 2012. In July 2015, the present school configuration was completed with seven new and 11 replacement classrooms.

During 2003–2013, the school grew by 52 per cent to 639 students. Westmere School | Te Rehu is a coeducational contributing primary (years 1–6) school with a roll of 363 as of July 2026.

Pasadena Intermediate School in Point Chevalier is well within walking/cycling distance for students transitioning from primary to secondary. Prior to the opening of that school in 1942, Westmere School included Years 7–8 (previously called Forms 1–2).

The closest state secondary school is Western Springs College (other options are Avondale College and Mount Albert Grammar School).

== Public transit and cycleways ==
The trams operated 1923–1953 to the zoo (former main entrance on Old Mill Rd) and 1931–1953 to Westmere (down Garnet Rd).

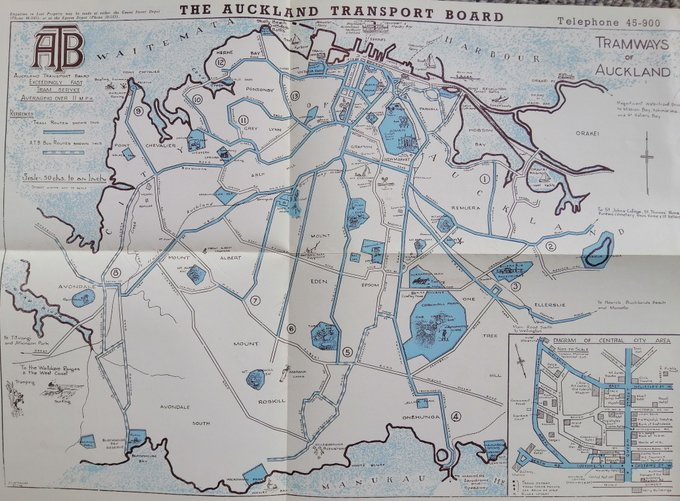
Auckland Transport Board route map, 1938

Before the tram track extension to the zoo in 1923, the route along Surrey Cres turned right onto Richmond Rd at Ambury's Corner and continued to the Grey Lynn terminus at Francis St, the closest point to the new zoo. During the following years, trams either ran from the Grey Lynn or zoo terminus to the city and on to Herne Bay. In 1931, the Herne Bay connection was discontinued and the Westmere service commenced. Service ceased on the Richmond Rd leg in 1932, as planned.

In 1925, a bus route was implemented from the junctions of Garnet Rd and Old Mill Rd to Kotare Ave and West End Rd. In 1927, this service was extended to the junction of West End rd and Jervois Rd. In 1931, this bus route ceased on the opening of the Westmere tram. Initially, service was more frequent for the zoo tram destination than the Westmere one. By 1939, no trams terminated at the zoo outside of rush hour.

Incorrectly set points sent a zoo-bound tram onto Garnet Rd in 1935, where a collision occurred with a city-bound one. At the Westmere terminus, a tram caught fire in 1938 and one was struck by lightning in 1939.

The fare zone from the city was three sections to the zoo and four to Westmere proper. When replaced by trolley buses, the zones remained unchanged. The bus turning loop for the zoo was just beyond the entrance (route 4Z) and for Westmere was at Oban Rd (route 4, later 035). By the 1960s, only one or two buses terminated at the zoo each day. Outbound buses from Westmere displayed the through route as Avondale (route 6) and in turn at the Avondale terminus, the converse applied. By 1980, only diesel buses operated. Privatization of the system in that decade led to the present routes, which connect with the former Richmond Road (route 3) service or alternatively use Meola Rd and West End Rd linking to the former Herne Bay (route 1) service.

In 2016, Auckland Transport proposed changes to Westmere, Point Chevalier, Arch Hill, and Grey Lynn, which include the creation of cycleways, new bus stops and shelters, and the addition of pedestrian crossings. Numerous mistakes were made in the 2017 installation of the West Lynn cycleway. A bus stop blocking the view of a pedestrian crossing, leaving angle parking facing forward, and the cycle lane weaving in and out of parked vehicles, were fundamental deficiencies never rectified. Construction began on the Westmere cycleway in late 2023.

== Notable people ==
- Lisa Greenwood (1955–), novelist, resident.
- Charles Gregory (1901–1988), rugby league player, resident.
- Julie Le Clerc (19?–), chef and TV host, resident.
- Bryan Little (1966–), association football player, resident.
- Mike McRoberts (1966–), TV journalist, resident.
- Nathaniel Neale (1988–), rugby league player, resident.
- Pavlina Nola (1974–), tennis player, resident.
- Vincent O'Sullivan (1937–), writer, resident.
- Allan Pearce (1983–), association football player, resident.
- Graham Pearce (1977–), association football player, resident.
- Roy Powell (1907–1980), rugby league player, resident.
- Riki van Steeden (1976–), association football player, resident.
- Bryan Williams (1950–), rugby union player, resident.

== Demographics ==
The statistical area of Westmere North is slightly smaller than the suburb, which extends into the statistical area of Westmere South-Western Springs. Westmere North covers 0.65 km^{2} (0.25 sq mi) and had an estimated population of 2,340 as of June 2025, with a population density of 3,600 people per km^{2}.

Historical population
| Year | Pop. | ±% p.a. |
|---|---|---|
| 2006 | 2,148 | — |
| 2013 | 2,295 | +0.95% |
| 2018 | 2,343 | +0.41% |
| 2023 | 2,304 | −0.34% |

Westmere North had a population of 2,304 in the 2023 New Zealand census, a decrease of 39 people (−1.7%) since the 2018 census, and an increase of 9 people (0.4%) since the 2013 census. There were 1,101 males, 1,188 females and 15 people of other genders in 756 dwellings. 5.2% of people identified as LGBTIQ+. The median age was 41.5 years (compared with 38.1 years nationally). There were 441 people (19.1%) aged under 15 years, 429 (18.6%) aged 15 to 29, 1,134 (49.2%) aged 30 to 64, and 300 (13.0%) aged 65 or older.

People could identify as more than one ethnicity. The results were 85.9% European (Pākehā); 9.9% Māori; 5.5% Pasifika; 9.9% Asian; 1.7% Middle Eastern, Latin American and African New Zealanders (MELAA); and 1.2% other, which includes people giving their ethnicity as "New Zealander". English was spoken by 97.8%, Māori language by 2.3%, Samoan by 0.7%, and other languages by 13.8%. No language could be spoken by 1.6% (e.g. too young to talk). The percentage of people born overseas was 21.4, compared with 28.8% nationally.

Religious affiliations were 26.0% Christian, 3.4% Hindu, 0.1% Islam, 0.3% Māori religious beliefs, 0.3% Buddhist, 0.5% New Age, and 1.3% other religions. People who answered that they had no religion were 63.3%, and 4.8% of people did not answer the census question.

Of those at least 15 years old, 954 (51.2%) people had a bachelor's or higher degree, 669 (35.9%) had a post-high school certificate or diploma, and 234 (12.6%) people exclusively held high school qualifications. The median income was $63,800, compared with $41,500 nationally. 639 people (34.3%) earned over $100,000 compared to 12.1% nationally. The employment status of those at least 15 was that 1,035 (55.6%) people were employed full-time, 303 (16.3%) were part-time, and 51 (2.7%) were unemployed.
