= Northwestern Cycleway =

Cycle route in Auckland, New Zealand

Coordinates: 36.8721883°S 174.7072291°E

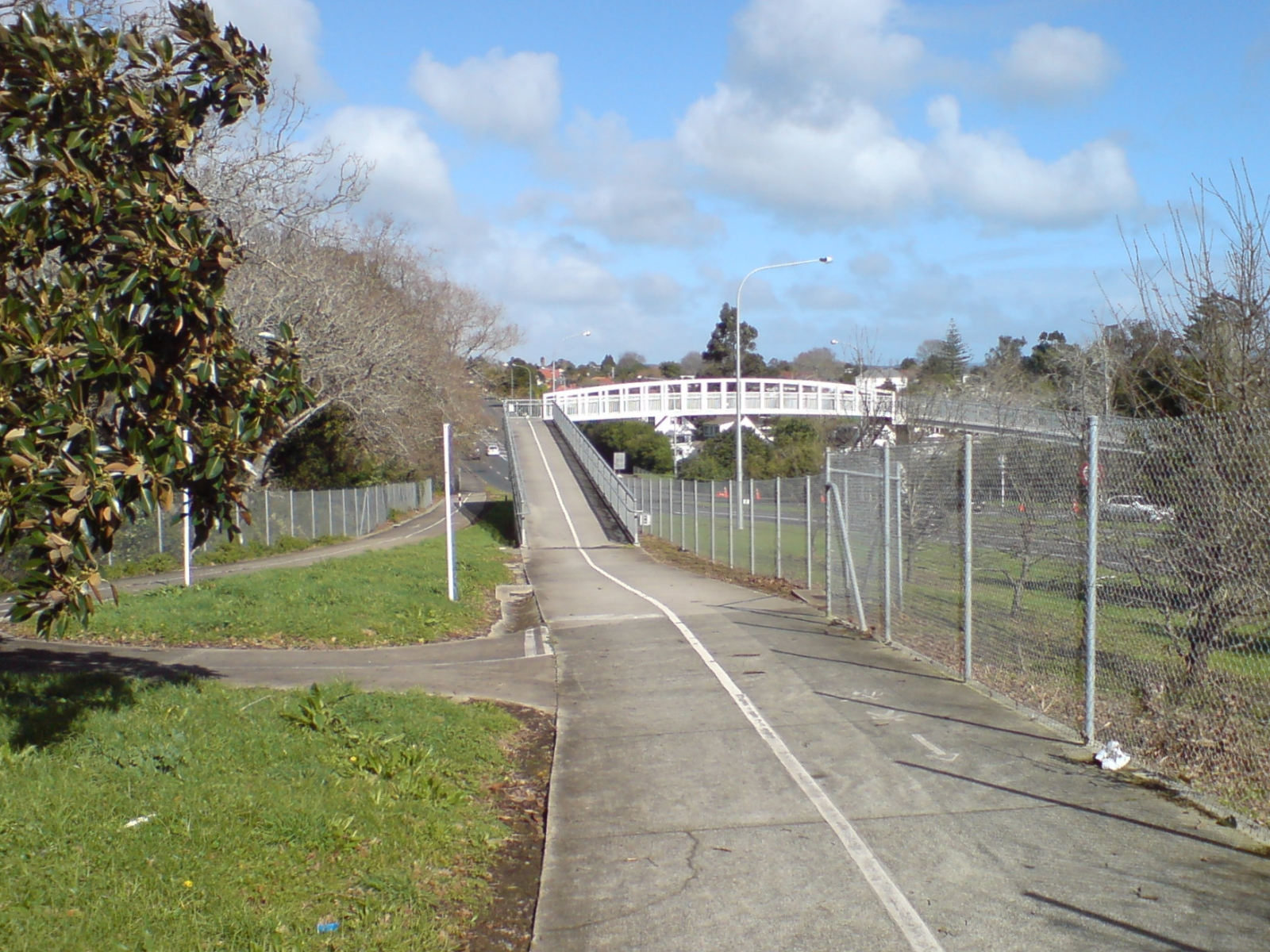
- The cycle overbridge over Great North Road, near Point Chevalier
- Length: 12 km (7.5 mi)
- Location: Auckland, New Zealand
- Established: 2004
- Use: Cycling
- Surface: Mostly off-road

Northwestern Cycleway
- Northwestern Cycleway

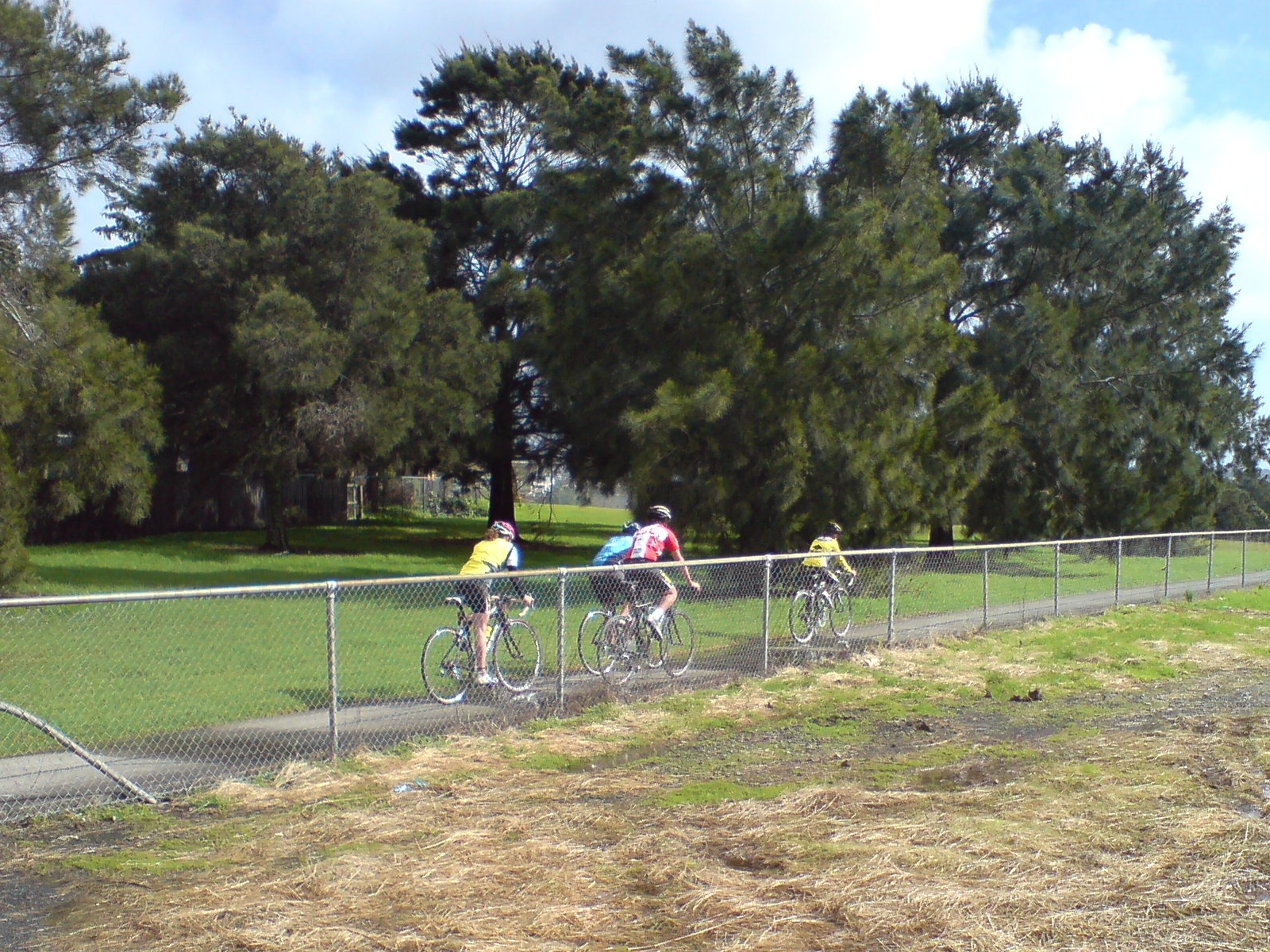
Cyclists on the cycleway in Te Atatu South.

The Northwestern Cycleway, sometimes also referred to as the North West or Northwestern Cycle Route, is a 12 km mostly off-road cycle route in New Zealand that connects the Auckland CBD with the suburb of Westgate. For most of its length, it runs alongside the Northwestern Motorway (State Highway 16).

The cycleway is used (as of March 2013) by approximately 800 users daily at the St Lukes Road intersection, approximately 750 daily at the Great North Road intersection, and approximately 650 daily at the Te Atatū intersection (some but not all users would have been counted at all three locations). For the St Lukes Road intersection, this represents a 70% growth since regular counts started in 2007.

== History ==
The original path was built by Waitakere City Council and Auckland City Council on land leased from Transit New Zealand. It originally only connected from Te Atatū to Waterview, before being extended in the early 2000s a further 5 km east towards the city, with a new overbridge over Great North Road. The overbridge was completed in 2004 as the (then) last major piece of the Northwestern Cycleway, and later won "Best cycle facility project" in the 2004 CAN Cycle Friendly Awards.

=== Kingsland upgrade ===
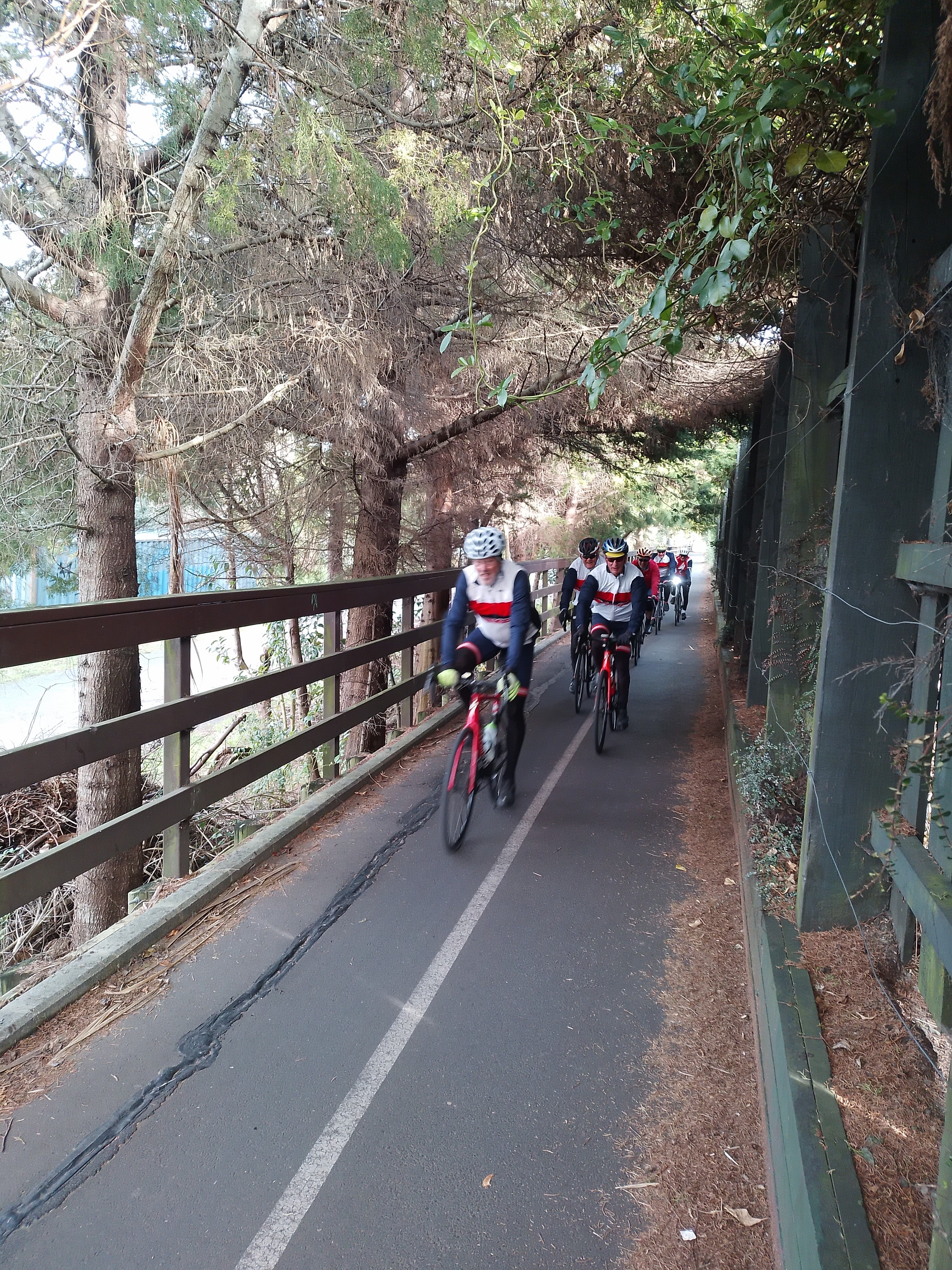
Northwestern Cycleway Cyclists

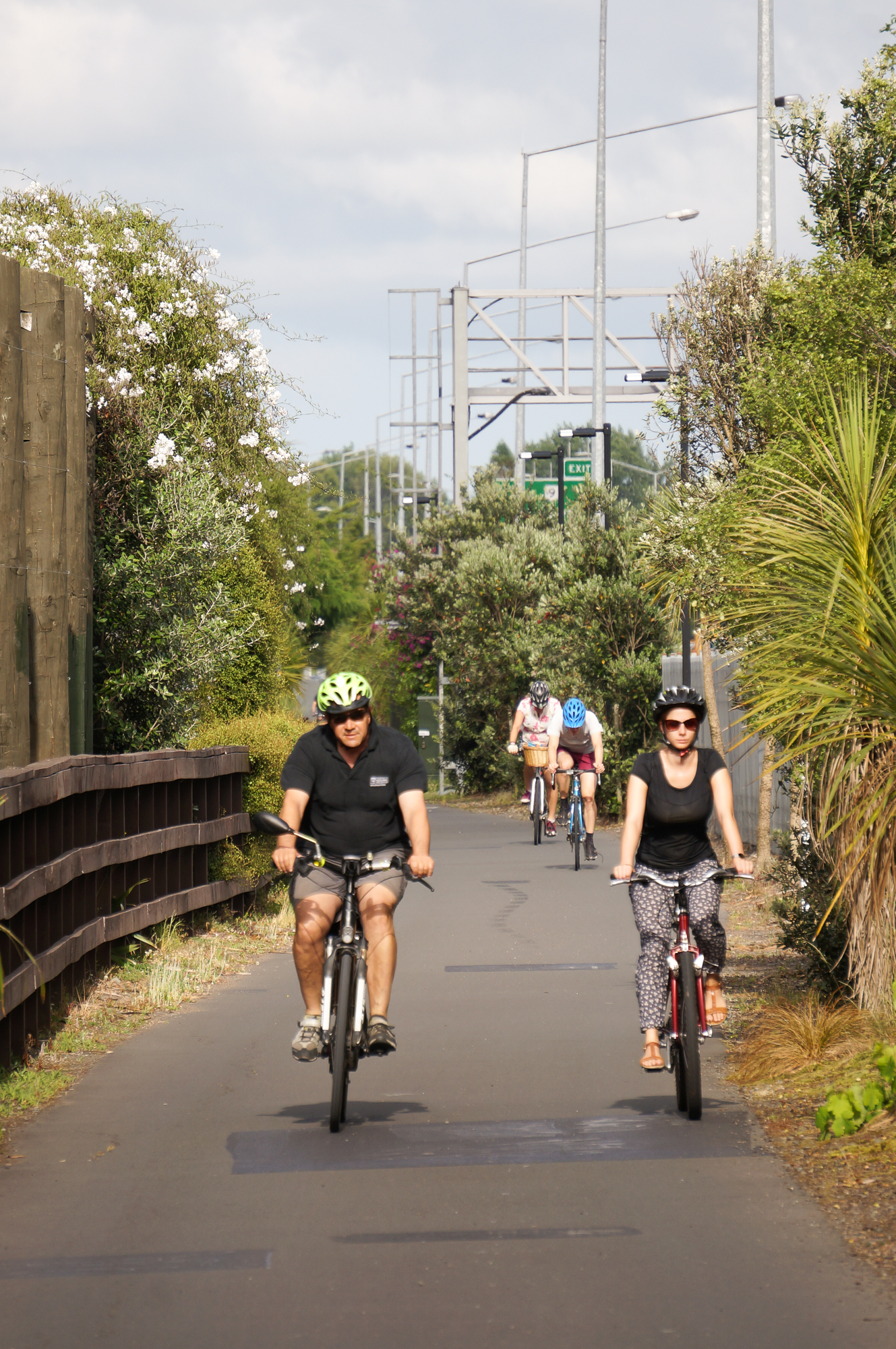
Commuters on the upgraded Kingsland stretch of the Northwestern Cycleway, 2017

In 2009–2010, the NZ Transport Agency constructed a previously-missing section in the Kingsland area, where cyclists to this point were forced to detour through a hilly residential area. The project cost $3.7m for approximately 1.2 km length, including five new access points, noise walls alongside the motorway and landscaping. The new path section was opened in April 2010, costing $3.7m (though much of this cost was in fact for new motorway noise walls for local residents) and was very well received by cyclists and the local cycle advocacy groups Cycle Action Auckland (now Bike Auckland).

=== Western and CBD extension ===
NZTA intends to improve and extend the path further northwest (from its current termination in Henderson) up to Westgate in the coming years, as part of the planned Waterview Connection motorway upgrades. The works will include improving path widths and reducing occasional flooding of the cycleway on the low-lying causeway.

Separate from the Waterview upgrades, as part of the Lincoln Road Interchange works, NZTA has also announced that it will extend the cycleway a further 2 km further west, from its current end at Central Park Drive to Huruhuru Road Overbridge.

Together with Auckland Council, NZTA is also extending the path eastwards towards the Auckland CBD, through Spaghetti Junction, a project which was also supported by the Auckland Regional Council / Auckland Regional Transport Authority. A preliminary alignment was assessed for the cycleway to cross Spaghetti Junction and then continue to the university area in the east of the CBD via Grafton Gully. The extension was originally hoped to be in place as early as 2012, with later extensions to the waterfront not ruled out.

In May 2012, it was confirmed that construction was expected to start near the end of 2012 for up to $10 million, though it is hoped to be constructed for less. The project's expected benefit-cost-ratio was $4.6 for every $ invested. The extension will reach 2.1 km from the current end of the cycleway at Upper Queen Street to Beach Road, though a further $3 million stage, that included an upgrade of the existing section along Ian McKinnon Drive, was deferred for now.

In November 2012, construction on the NZTA section of the cycleway extension began, to be completed 2014, with a Beach Road section, linking the new cycleway extension to Quay Street / Tamaki Drive to be constructed by Auckland Transport for $1.5 million by 2015. The Grafton Gully Cycleway was completed in 2014.

=== Link to SH20 / Waikaraka Cycleways ===
In May 2011, the Board of Inquiry hearing the resource consent process for the Waterview Connection decided that NZTA was to set aside $8 million for the construction of an off-road surface cycleway between SH16 and the existing SH20 section in Hillsborough, as part of the tunneling project. This will create a connection between the Northwestern Cycleway and the SH20 and Waikaraka Cycleways.

== User growth ==
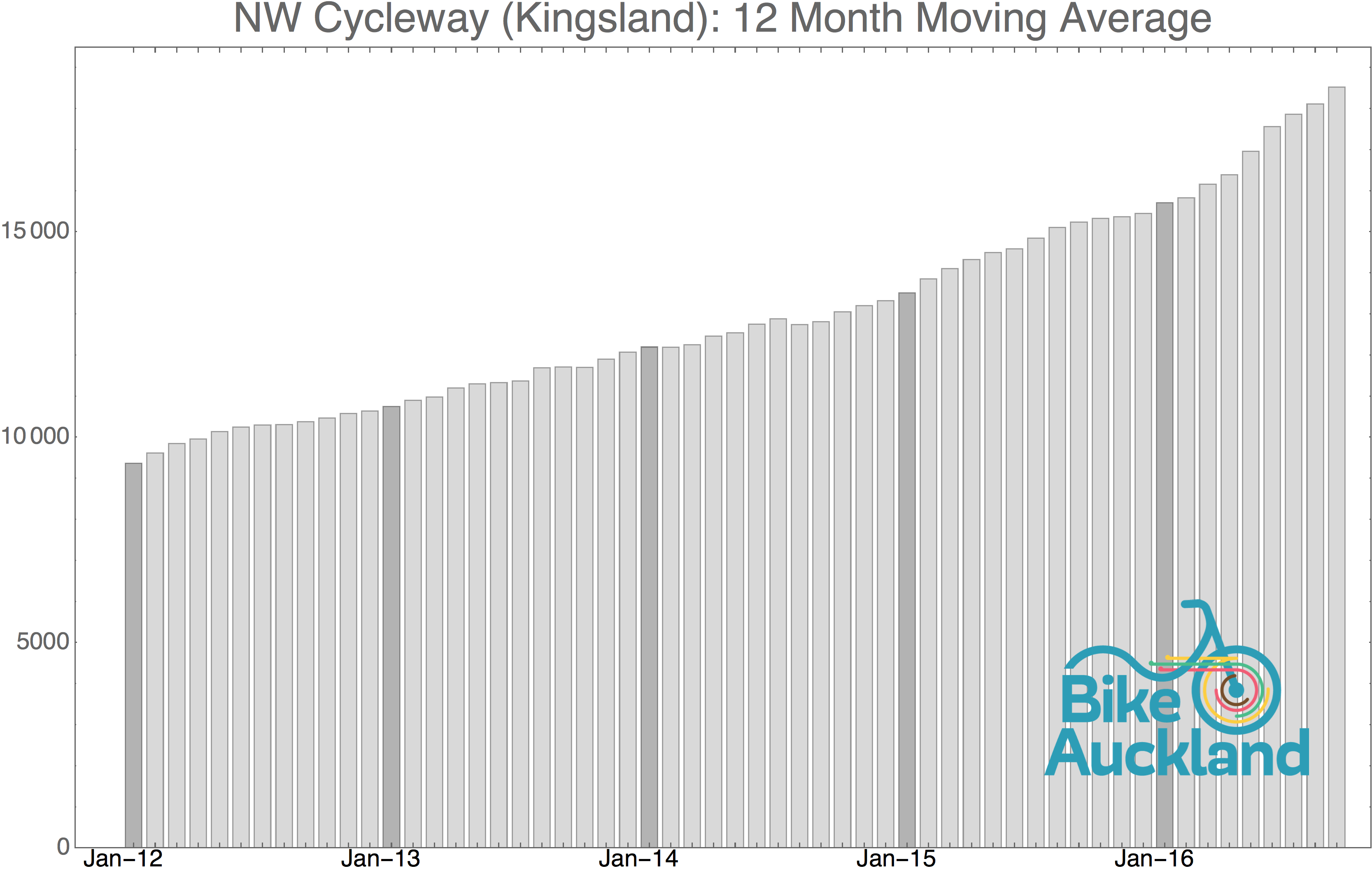
Cycle growth as a 12-month-rolling average at the Kingsland counter.

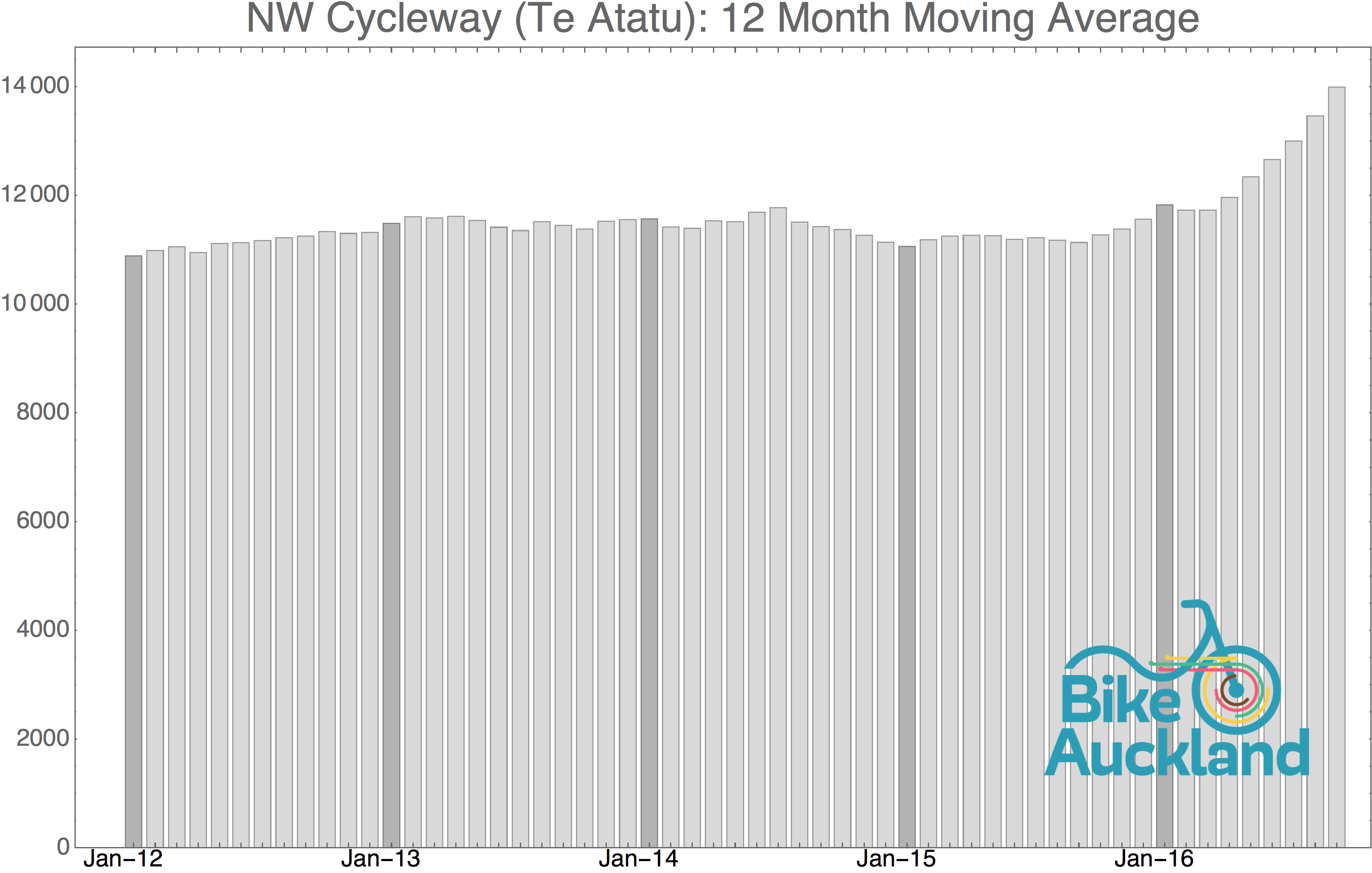
Cycle growth as a 12-month-rolling average at the Te Atatu counter.

A cyclist count study for the Auckland Regional Transport Authority found that at the Great North Road section of the cycleway, the average daily number of users in 2008 was 532, a gain of 59% compared to the year before. In 2010, this success trend continued, with an increase of 70% over the 2007 levels to over 600 cyclists.
