= Westgate Bridge =

Westgate Bridge may refer to:

- West Gate Bridge, Melbourne, Australia
- Westgate Pedestrian and Cycle Bridge, Auckland, New Zealand
- Westgate Bridge (Topeka, Kansas), United States
