= Oakley Creek =

Creek in New Zealand

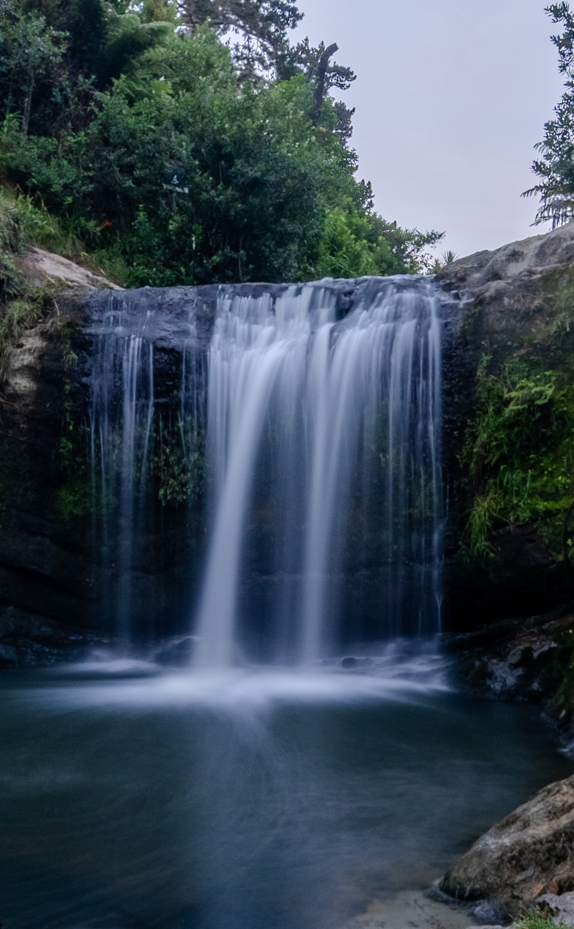
- The Oakley Creek waterfall at Waterview

- Mouth of the Oakley Creek
- Route of the Oakley Creek
- Native name: Māori: Te Auaunga

Location
- Country: New Zealand
- Region: Auckland Region

Physical characteristics
- Source
  - location: Mount Roskill
  - coordinates: 36.90771°S 174.74326°E
- Mouth: Waitematā Harbour
  - coordinates: 36.87263°S 174.69558°E

Basin features
- Progression: Oakley Creek → Waitematā Harbour → Hauraki Gulf → Pacific Ocean
- Waterfalls: Oakley Creek Waterfall
- Bridges: Te Piringa Bridge, Hinaki (Eel Trap) Bridge

Oakley Creek (Māori: Te Auaunga) is a creek in Auckland, New Zealand. While heavily human-modified (being surrounded for most of its length by suburban development, especially in the upper reaches), it has a number of important ecological features, such as having the only natural waterfall on the Auckland isthmus (which is also the largest in urban Auckland).

== Geography ==
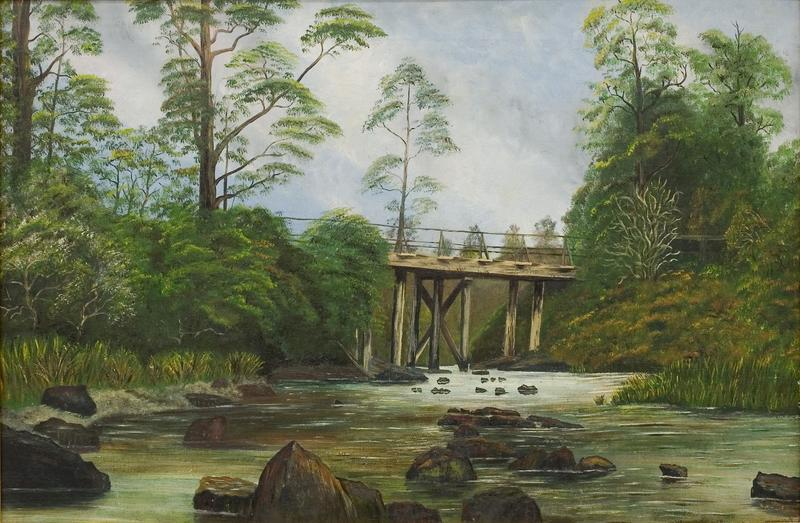
Bridge on the Oakley Creek by Mina Cox, showing a view of the creek circa 1883

Oakley Creek runs from Mount Roskill to the Whau River portage.

After the eruption of Ōwairaka / Mount Albert, the upper reaches of the creek were dammed, and a peat swamp formed around the modern-day suburb of Mount Roskill. The Oakley Creek is the longest urban stream on the Auckland isthmus, at approximately 15 kilometres in length, and prior to European settlement was surrounded by wetlands and swamps.

== History ==
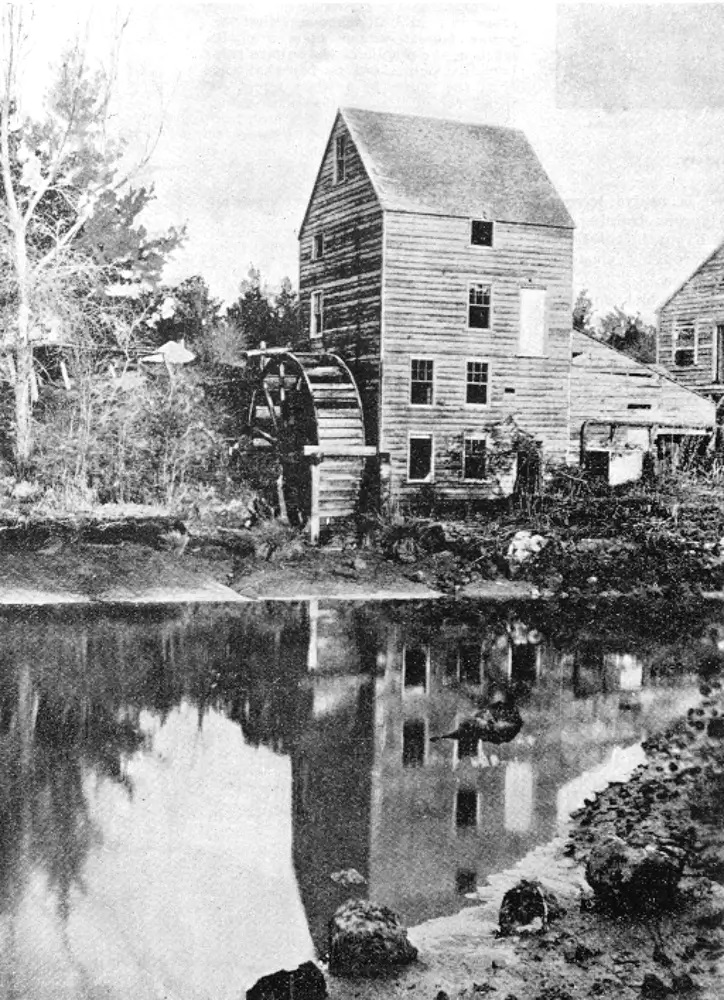
Garrett Bro's old tannery on the Oakley Creek, 1898

Tāmaki Māori used the creek as a source of crayfish, eels and weka. Flax and raupō, which grew along the banks of the creek, were harvested here to create Māori traditional textiles. The Māori language name Te Auaunga means "swirling waters" or "whirlpool", and the wetlands of the creek were traditionally known as Te Wai o Rakataura ("The Waters of Rakataura"). Traditional stories of the stream describe it as being navigable by waka for much of its length, and as a food and material resource for the kāinga of the area. The northern area of the creek has a number of archeologically significant sites from this era, and were left relatively intact due to this area not becoming as developed as other parts of the Auckland isthmus in the 19th and 20th centuries.

During European settlement in the mid 19th century, much of the catchment of the Oakley Creek was redeveloped into produce or dairy farms. In 1845 entrepreneur Edwin Oakley established a flax mill, powered by the water of the creek. Over time, the English language name for the stream became Oakley Creek, or Oakley's Creek. In 1859 John Thomas purchased 8 acres (3.2 ha) and had water rights to the creek. Thomas established a flour, known as Thomas' Mill. Oakley Creek was considered as a potential water supply for the growing City of Auckland in 1860; however, it was rejected as the cost of compensation for Thomas was considered prohibitive. In 1879 the property was sold to the Garrett Brothers who established a tannery. The tannery operated for 11 years before being demolished in 1912.

The first bridge across the creek was constructed at Mount Albert in 1854 and the Mount Albert adjacent to the creek developed into suburban housing in the 1920s and 1930s.

During the Great Depression in New Zealand in the 1930s, the Auckland and Suburban Drainage Board employed 100 men to straighten and deepen the creek, as a measure intended to prevent future flooding. In the 1940s and 1950s, there was a major housing boom in the Mount Roskill area. Due to the development, the Oakley Creek regularly flooded, including major floods in Wesley in 1948 and 1953.

In March 1954, major work was undertaken on the Oakley Creek, and volcanic scoria was used as a barrier along the creek's banks. Despite this, Dominion Road would still regularly flood, and continued to up until major works projects were completed in the 1980s. During the 2000s and 2010s, a motorway link between the Northwestern Motorway and the Southwestern Motorway was constructed, called the Waterview Connection. During construction, much of the Oakley Creek catchment was redeveloped into native bush reserves and urban parks.

=== Revitalisation ===
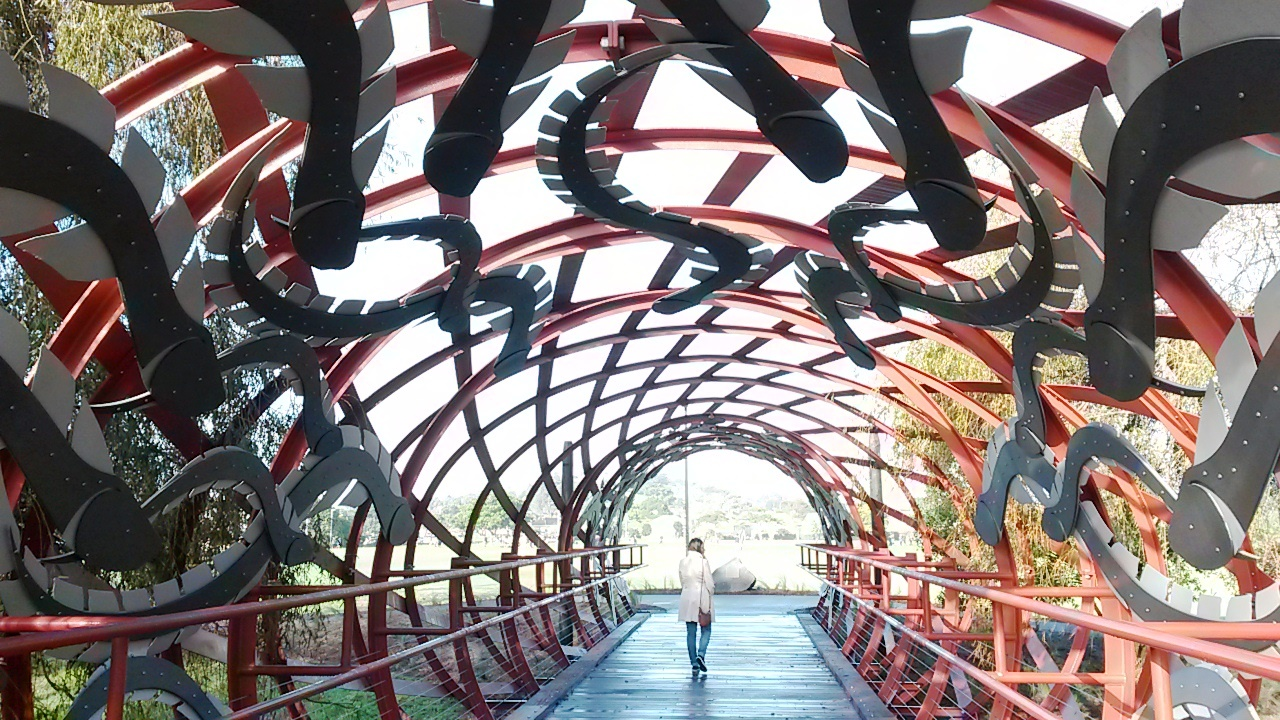
Hinaki (Eel Trap) Bridge

In 2004, a local community group called the Friends of Oakley Creek was established, in order to better protect the creek and improve its surrounding natural environment. One of the group's major concerns during this period was the impact of the SH20 Waterview Connection on the stream, i.e. the form this motorway is to take under or near the creek. Other concerns include the high levels of metals in the stream, such as zinc, copper and lead, from its urbanised catchment, and the fact that the culvert under Great North Road impedes fish migration. Due to the impact of increased community interest, a set of Oakley Creek Rehabilitation Guidelines was developed in 2011, to monitor the works which occurred near the stream, including reintroducing a riparian margin. Auckland Council also adopted these guidelines for some areas of the stream not affected by the motorway.

On 5 June 2015, a 20 metre long pedestrian and cycle footbridge called the Hinaki Bridge (also known as the Eel Trap Bridge), was opened at the Mount Roskill War Memorial Park. In 2017, the Waterview Shared Path was opened, as a walking and cycling connection through Auckland. As a part of this work, a footbridge connecting Waterview to Mount Albert called Te Piringa Bridge was constructed, opening in July 2017. Following the 2023 Auckland Anniversary Weekend floods, much of the northern sections of the Waterview Shared Path, and access to the creek, were restricted.

== Gallery ==
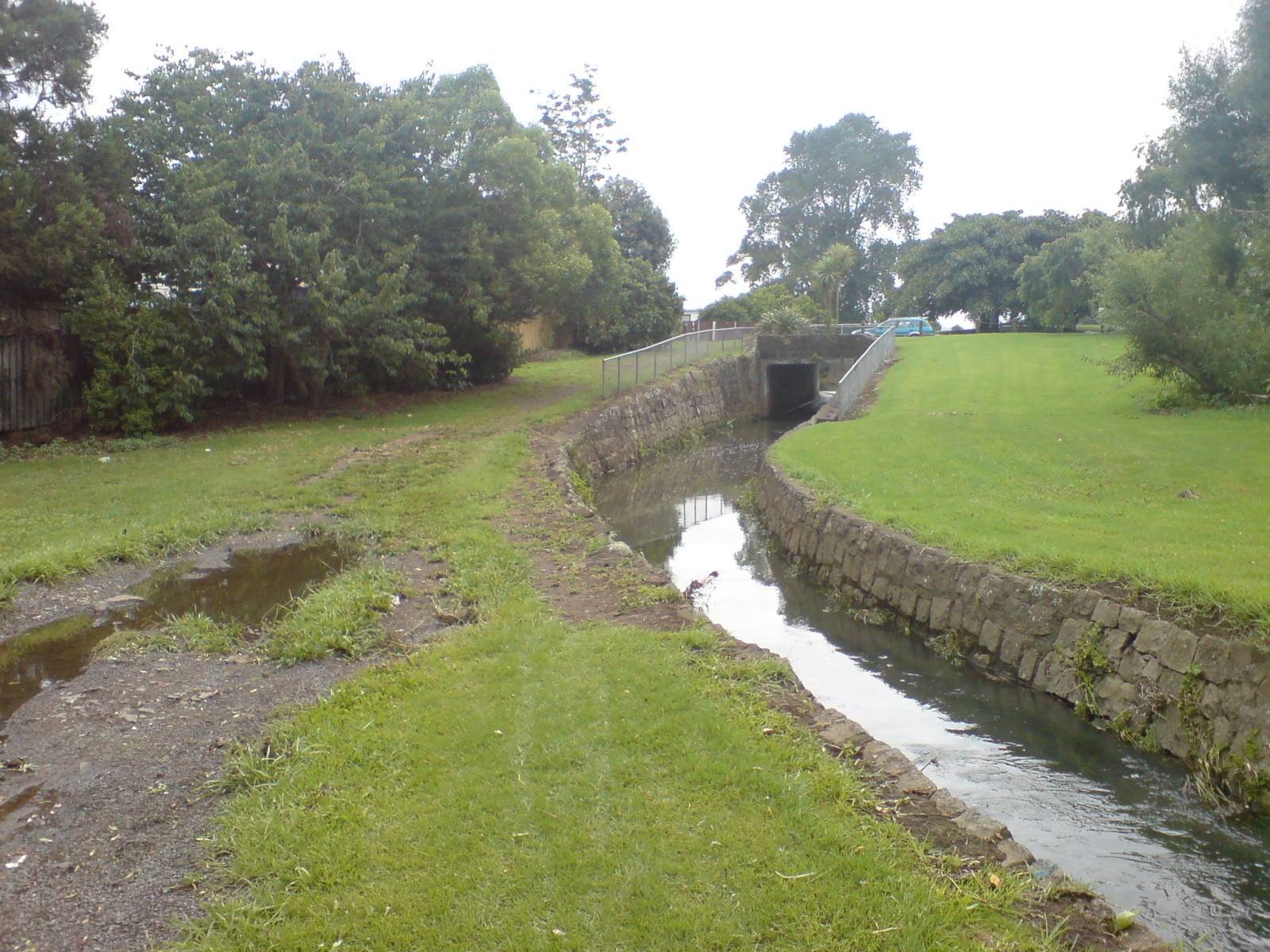
The rock-lined upper channel of the stream

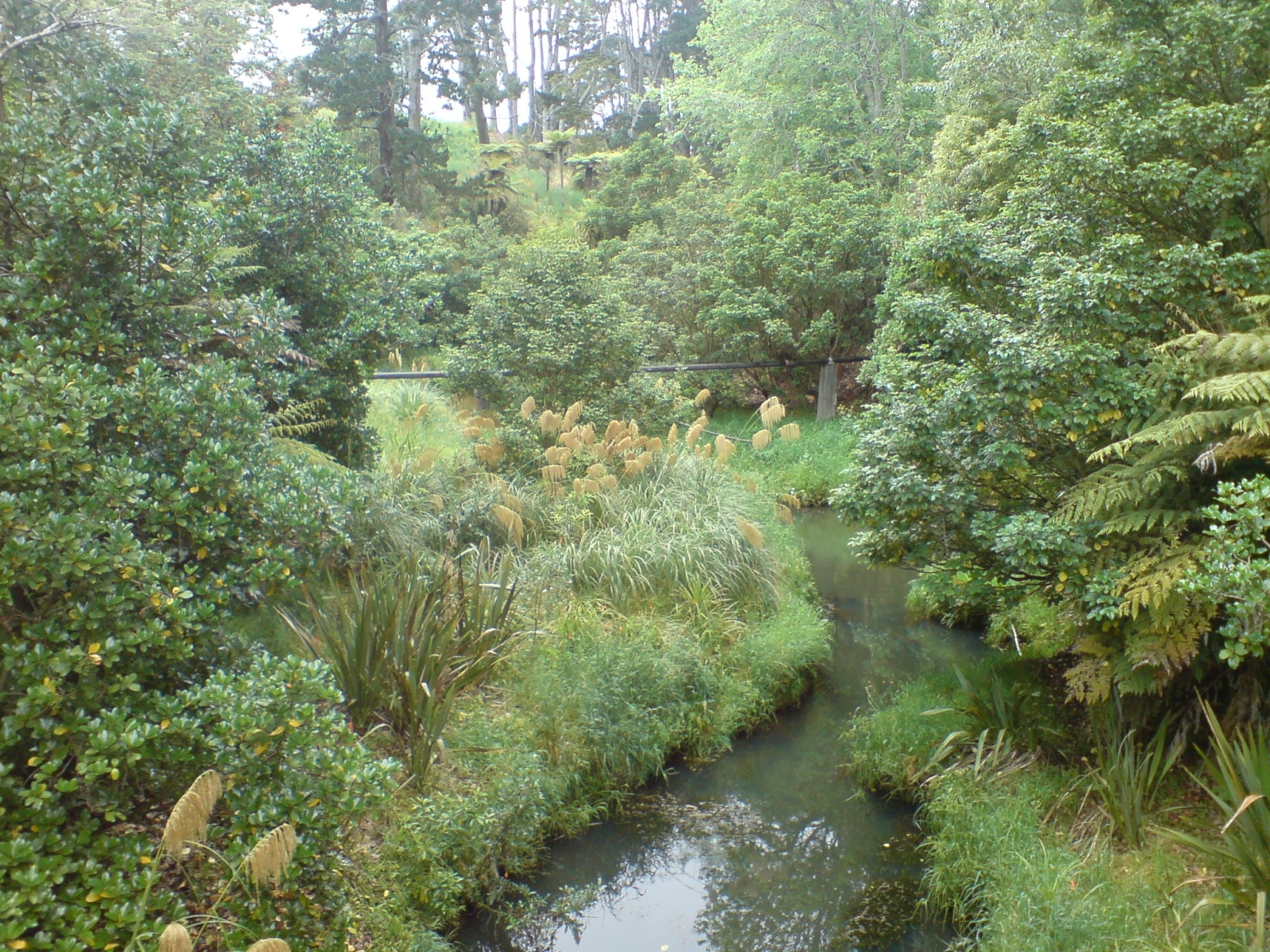
The relatively unmodified northern reaches of the Oakley Creek

== Bibliography ==
- Reidy, Jade (2013). Not Just Passing Through: the Making of Mt Roskill (2nd ed.). Auckland: Puketāpapa Local Board. ISBN 978-1-927216-97-2. OCLC 889931177. Wikidata Q116775081.
