= Great North Road, Auckland =

Major road in central and western Auckland

Great North Road
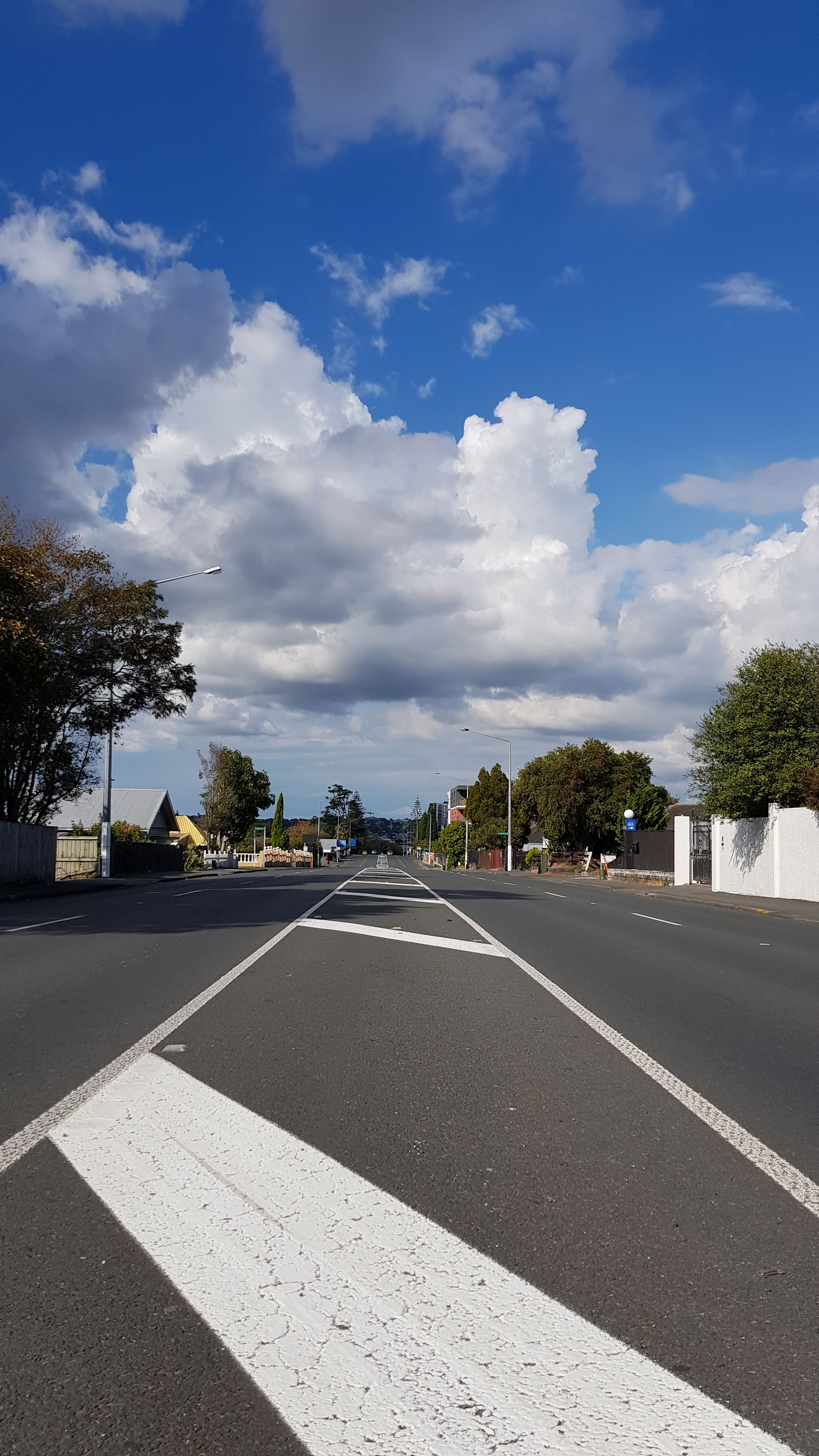
- Great North Road in New Lynn
- Location: Auckland
- Coordinates: 36.909°S 174.676°E

Great North Road is a major thoroughfare in Auckland, in the North Island of New Zealand. It runs from the fringe of the Auckland CBD to West Auckland. The road is the second longest in Auckland, after its counterpart, Great South Road, and is named after the Great North Road in Britain. In the days before the Auckland Harbour Bridge, Northern Motorway and Northwestern Motorway were built, it was the main road route from central Auckland to the areas north of the Auckland isthmus. In the 1960s, it carried 25,000–30,000 vehicles a day.

== History ==
In c.1873 Great North Road was extended west into Henderson. In 1898 the road through Henderson was realigned and moved slightly.

== Major intersections ==
Local board	Suburb	jct	Destinations
Waitemata	Grey Lynn		Ponsonby Road – Ponsonby; Karangahape Road – City Centre; Newton Road – Newmarket
Waitemata	Grey Lynn		Bond Street – Mount Roskill
Waitemata	Grey Lynn		Tuarangi Rd; Williamson Avenue – Ponsonby
Waitemata	Grey Lynn		Surrey Crescent
Waitemata	Western Springs		Stadium Road – Western Springs Stadium; SH 16 east (Northwestern Motorway) – Auckland
Waitemata	Western Springs		Saint Lukes Road – Mount Albert, Remuera
Waitemata	Western Springs		Motions Road
Albert-Eden	Western Springs		Motions Road
Albert-Eden	Point Chevalier		Kiwi Road
Albert-Eden	Point Chevalier		Carrington Road – Mount Albert, Mount Wellington; Point Chevalier Road – Point Chevalier
Albert-Eden	Waterview		SH 16 east (Northwestern Motorway) – Auckland
Albert-Eden	Waterview		SH 16 west (Northwestern Motorway) – Helensville
Albert-Eden	Waterview		Alford Street
Albert-Eden	Waterview		Blockhouse Bay Road – Blockhouse Bay
Whau / Waitakere Ranges	Avondale		Blockhouse Bay Road – Blockhouse Bay
Whau / Waitakere Ranges	Avondale		Henry Street; Victor Street
Whau / Waitakere Ranges	Avondale		Ash Street – New Lynn
Whau / Waitakere Ranges	Avondale		Rosebank Road
Whau / Waitakere Ranges	Avondale		Saint Jude Street – Mount Albert; Saint Georges Road – Blockhouse Bay; Wingate Street
Whau / Waitakere Ranges	New Lynn		Portage Road
Whau / Waitakere Ranges	New Lynn		Veronica Street
Whau / Waitakere Ranges	New Lynn		Memorial Drive; Delta Avenue
Whau / Waitakere Ranges	New Lynn		McCrae Way
Whau / Waitakere Ranges	New Lynn		Clark Street
Whau / Waitakere Ranges	New Lynn		Titirangi Road – Titirangi; Rata Street – Avondale
Whau / Waitakere Ranges	Glen Eden		West Coast Road – Glen Eden, Piha
Whau / Waitakere Ranges	Glen Eden		Archibald Road
Whau / Waitakere Ranges	Glen Eden		Brandon Road
Whau / Waitakere Ranges	Glen Eden		Glenview Road – Glen Eden; Sabulite Road
Whau / Waitakere Ranges	Glen Eden		Hepburn Road
Henderson-Massey	Glendene		Hepburn Road
Henderson-Massey	Glendene		View Road; Felgrove Street
Henderson-Massey	Glendene		Norcross Ave; Te Atatu Road – Te Atatū South
Henderson-Massey	Henderson		Norcross Ave; Te Atatu Road – Te Atatū South
Henderson-Massey	Henderson		Edsel Street; Edmonton Road – Waitakere Hospital, Te Atatū South
Henderson-Massey	Henderson		Railside Avenue; Ratanui Street
Henderson-Massey	Henderson		Henderson Valley Road – Waitakere Central; Alderman Drive – Te Atatū South
Henderson-Massey	Henderson		Mount Lebanon Lane; Swanson Road – Ranui, Swanson; Lincoln Road – Waitakere Hospital, Helensville; Buscomb Avenue
