= Westgate Pedestrian and Cycle Bridge =

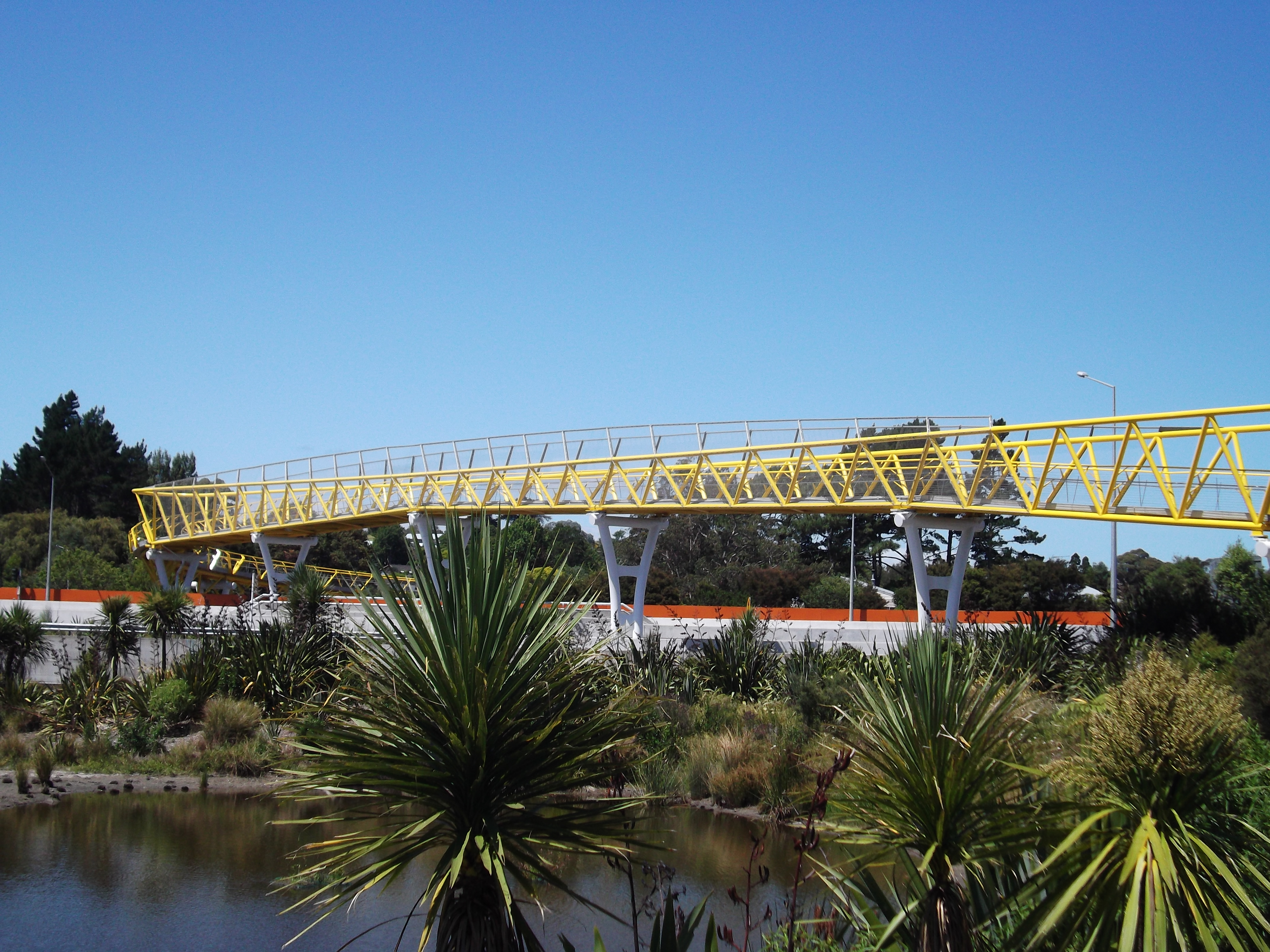
- The Westgate Pedestrian and Cycle Bridge in 2013
- Coordinates: 36.8223°S 174.6161°E
- Carries: Pedestrians, Cyclists
- Crosses: Northwestern Motorway
- Locale: Massey, Auckland, New Zealand

Characteristics
- Total length: 209 metres (686 ft)
- Width: 3 metres (9.8 ft)

The Westgate Pedestrian and Cycle Bridge is a 209-metre-long (686 ft) motorway overbridge crossing the Northwestern Motorway near Westgate in Auckland, New Zealand. Construction began in late 2012 and was completed in January 2013.

The three-metre-wide (9.8 ft) bridge caters for both pedestrians and cyclists, as well as mobility-impaired users. It was designed by Jasmax (architects) and Aurecon Consulting Engineers, and built by HEB Construction, and cost approximately $6 million, paid for by Auckland Transport and NZTA. The initial bridge works included work in the Manutewhau Walk Reserve on the eastern side of the bridge, including replacing pine trees with native trees.

The bridge, along with the Clarks Lane Footbridge and the Beachcroft Footbridge, won a 2013 Resene Total Colour award.

Initially, the main function is to provide a west–east connection for the local area, though in the long run, it is intended to link into a future extension of the Northwestern Cycleway up to the bridge.

== History ==
It was initially approved in the mid 2008s, as a response to a 2004 death of an 11-year-old boy hit by a van while he was crossing the motorway, and in response to continued illegal crossing over the motorway of several dozen people daily, trying to avoid long detours in reaching the nearby shopping centre west of the motorway from the suburbs to the east. However, from the time to approval until construction start, it took another four years until funding was allocated.
