= Westgate Bridge (Topeka, Kansas) =

Westgate/Highway 75 Bridge
- Coordinates: 39.0715°N 95.7313°W
- Carries: 4 lanes of US-75
- Crosses: Kansas River
- Locale: Topeka, Kansas

Characteristics
- Design: Unknown

Location
- Interactive map of Westgate/Highway 75 Bridge

The Westgate Bridge is a four-lane automobile crossing of the Kansas River at Topeka, Kansas, United States. The bridge runs concurrent with U.S. Highway 75. The bridge extends from Interstate 70 across the river to NW 17th Street.
