= Waterview Connection =

Road in New Zealand

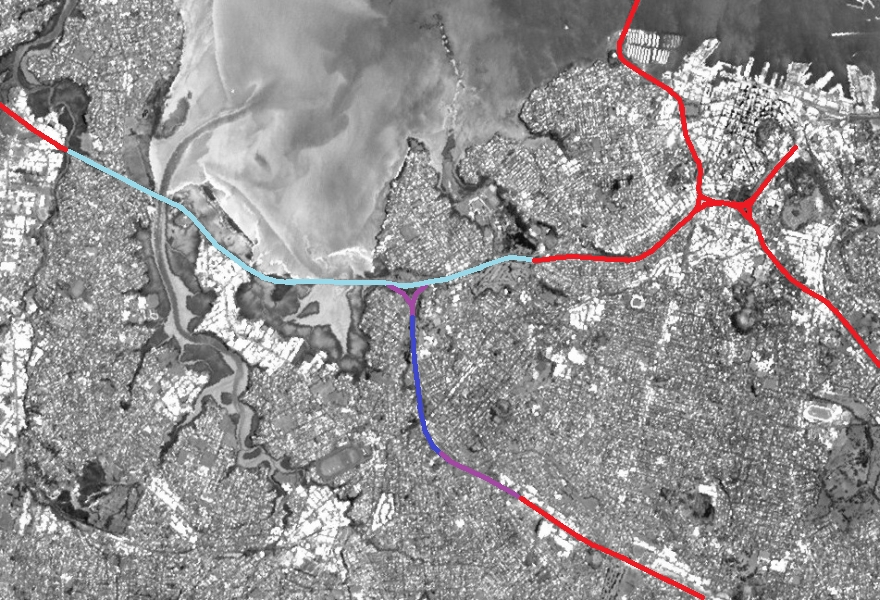
- While generally considered a "tunnel project", the Waterview Connection also included other large motorway works. The connection consists of the purple (above ground) and dark blue (bored tunnels) sections. The section of SH16 with extra lanes added is shown in light blue.
- Location: Auckland, New Zealand
- Proposer: NZ Transport Agency
- Project website: http://www.nzta.govt.nz/projects/waterviewconnection
- Status: Opened 2 July 2017
- Type: Road & tunnel
- Cost estimate: $1.7 billion
- Stakeholders: Government of New Zealand, NZ Transport Agency, Auckland Council, Campaign for Better Transport, Cycle Action Auckland, Friends of Oakley Creek, North West Community Association, various further community groups and submitters

The Waterview Connection is a motorway section through west/central Auckland, New Zealand. It connects State Highway 20 in the south at Mt Roskill to State Highway 16 in the west at Point Chevalier, and is a part of the Western Ring Route.

The Waterview Connection is 4.5 km long, of which 2.5 km are in the form of twin tunnels. The Waterview Tunnel supersedes the Lyttelton Road Tunnel as New Zealand's longest road tunnels. By 2026, the link is expected to carry 83,000 vehicles a day. There are three lanes of traffic in each tunnel.

== Planning history ==
The project had an extensive planning history, with the earliest consultation in 2000, though the proposal for a route roughly in the area dates from much earlier.

=== Routes considered ===
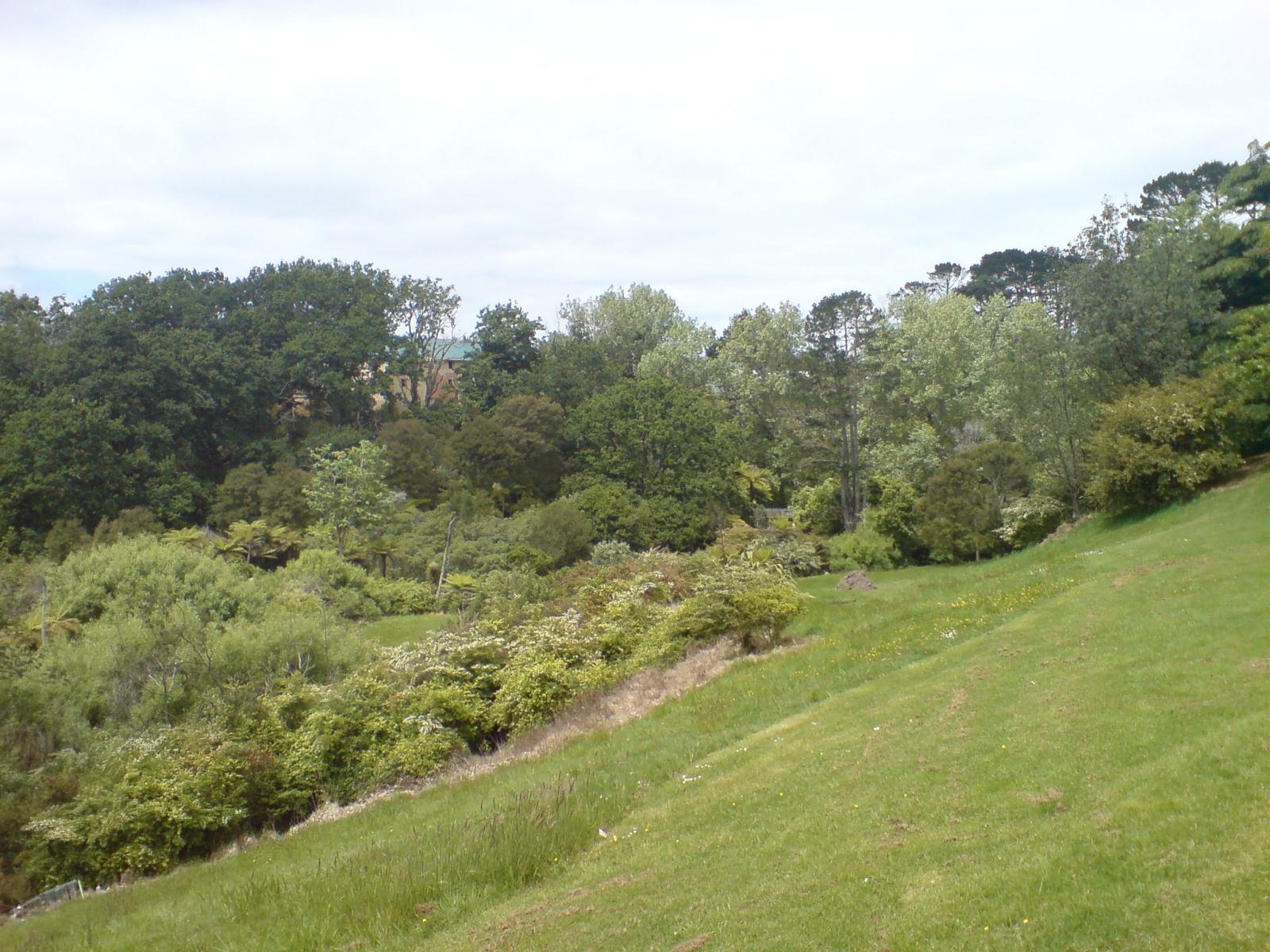
Oakley Creek, near where the bored tunnels in the final (2010) alignments stop (and was joined to cut and cover built tunnels for the last section towards SH16).

Several routes were considered, all being variations of either a connection to SH16 along the Rosebank Peninsula (e.g. AR1, AR3) or at the Great North Road interchange at Waterview (e.g. AW1, AW4). It was generally assumed that below-ground construction would be required where AR3 passed through Avondale Heights, to a maximum depth of 41 m. On the basis of technical and environmental assessments, the AR3 and AW4 route options were dismissed.

Transit New Zealand selected the Waterview connection as its preferred route, with the support of the Auckland City Council and Waitakere City Council, over the Rosebank option, which was the preferred route of the Auckland Regional Council. The previous AW1 and AW4 routes favoured a New North Road interchange with ramps facing south, and full connections at the Waterview interchange. The preferred route was announced with a Great North Road interchange replacing New North Road and no southbound access at Waterview. This proved unpopular with local residents, and it was considered unlikely a bored tunnel could accommodate an interchange because of its depth.

=== Bored tunnels preferred ===
On 7 February 2008, bored tunnels were announced as Transit's preferred option. The NZ Transport Agency's preferred option was a pair of two-lane tunnels costing $1.89 billion, rather than a pair of three-lane tunnels costing $2.14 billion. NZTA's traffic modelling indicated that two-lane tunnels would reach capacity within 10 years of operation. Map of Tunnel Route

Transit NZ's board resolved to seek a designation over land for a $1.89 billion pair of motorway tunnels through Waterview. The board called for a report from officials on managing fumes from the tunnel "to benchmark the proposed approach incorporated in the design work to date against current international best practice". In response to submissions questioning the adequacy of just two traffic lanes running in each direction, it sought a comparative assessment of the operational performance and costs of providing three-lane tunnels, initially estimated at $2.14 billion.

=== Public-private partnership investigation ===
The government set up a joint public-private sector steering group to investigate the feasibility of a public-private partnership (PPP) as a procurement method for the Waterview Connection Project, evaluating the PPP alongside a conventional public sector procurement method to determine how the two methods compared in terms of value for money. The steering group had as an independent chairperson, Sir Brian Elwood, and reported directly to the Ministers of Finance and Transport.

It was announced on 26 August 2008 that the steering group had advised the Government that a public-private partnership (PPP) - which would require a $2 toll per trip - was the best way of building the new $2 billion section of the city's Western Ring Route. Transport Minister Annette King asked officials to do more work on several critical factors before the Government committed to a PPP.

=== Air quality concerns ===
In October 2008 the NZ Transport Agency released report findings which showed that tunnel emissions would have a negligible effect on local air quality. These findings were disputed by Waterview Primary School representatives, who claimed that the report hadn't taken into account the impact of tolling "which could add more traffic to surface roads", hadn't given sufficient consideration to "international best practice on air filtering", and had failed to account for "ventilation fans being turned off during off-peak times, allowing emissions to escape through the tunnel openings". They also asked for reconsideration of "taking a section of the school’s playing field for use during the five-year construction period".

Concern was also expressed by developer Greg Burgess, who had consent for building 83 new homes 19 metres away from the Owairaka ventilation stack. The developer wanted the ventilation stack moved further away, but there were worries that fumes might be pushed closer to Christ the King School.

=== Request to reconsider Rosebank route ===
The Auckland Regional Council requested NZTA to reconsider whether the proposed Waterview Connection was the most cost-effective way of completing the Western Ring Road, with a reconsideration of the costs and benefits of the alternative Rosebank route.

=== Cost of bored tunnels questioned ===
In 2009, the CEO of Federated Farmers, Conor English (brother of Finance Minister Bill English), announced that Federated Farmers wanted the government to review the tunnelling with a view to cancelling it. He argued in an editorial that the project represented a "tunnel with no hill", costed at that time at about $1.9 billion or about $600 million a kilometre. Therefore, the motorway should instead be built as a surface road, and the savings invested into water storage projects benefitting farming.

On 30 January 2009 Transport Minister Steven Joyce announced his concern with the $3.16 billion cost (including financing costs of more than $500 million and an upgrade of the nearby Northwestern Motorway for $240 million) of three-lane tunnels. Because he was "not comfortable" with the idea of reducing the tunnels to two lanes with no ability to enlarge them for future traffic demand, he gave officials until April to review all options for a connection of State Highway 20 to the Northwestern Motorway at Waterview, including a potentially disruptive surface route through Mount Albert and previously discarded "cut and cover" proposals. He was unable to predict a completion date for Auckland's 42 km western ring route, saying officials regarded a 2015 target of the previous Labour government as "aspirational".

=== Combination tunnel method announced ===
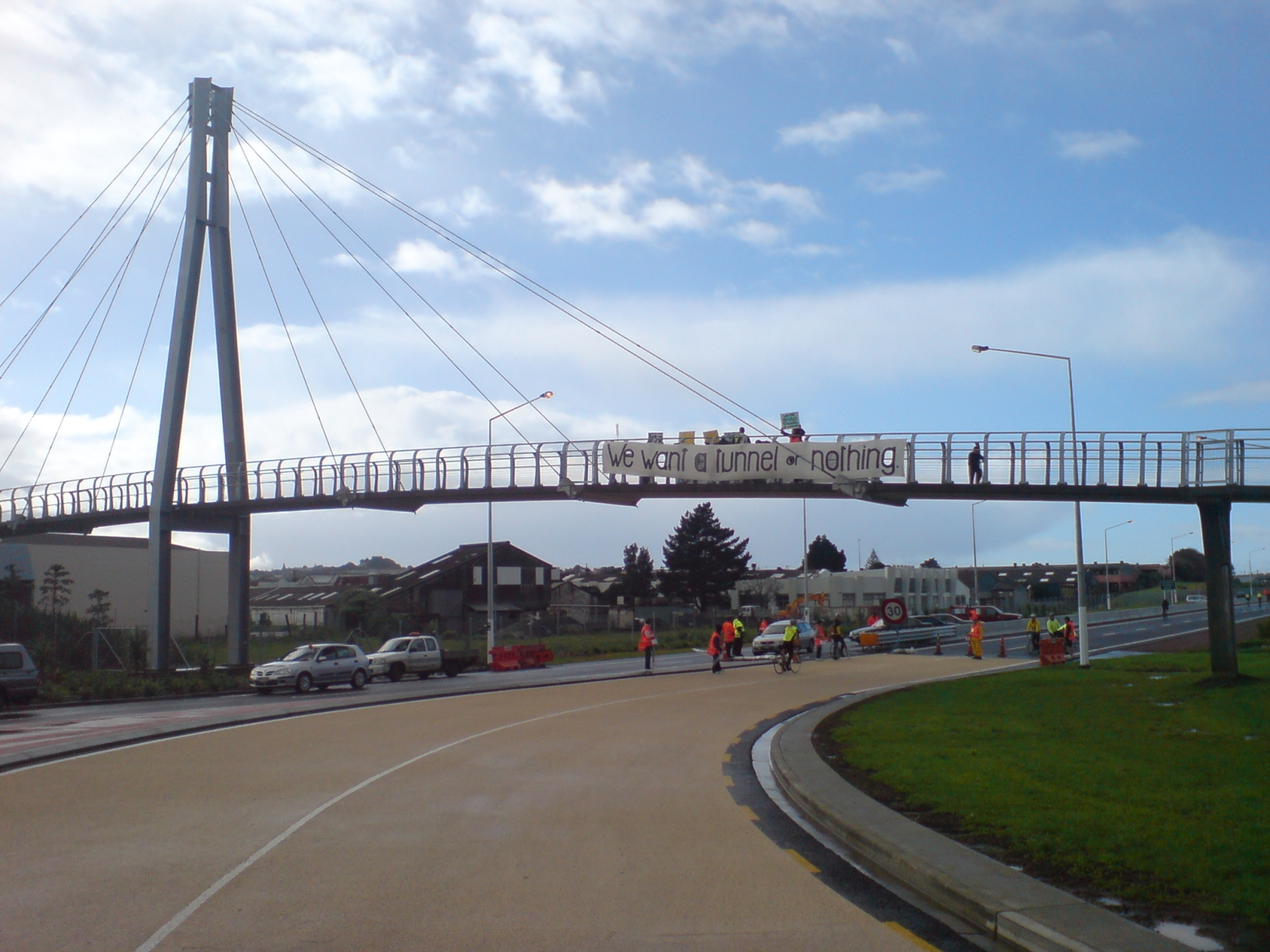
Local protests, such as here at the end of the existing stub of SH20, played a role in a combined surface and tunnel being reconsidered.

On 13 May 2009 NZTA announced its new preferred route for the Waterview Connection motorway as a combination of surface, bored tunnel and cut and cover tunnel. The tunnels would be constructed with provision for three lanes in each direction.

A raised surface motorway through Alan Wood Park and the short section between the bored and cut and cover tunnel portals near the Great North Rd and Blockhouse Bay Rd intersection were the largest differences between this new preferred route and the previous bored tunnel option. At $1,165 million, it was cheaper than the $1,974 million two-lane bored tunnel option and the $2,335 million three-lane bored tunnel option.

=== Combined surface and tunnel alignment confirmed ===
On 11 September 2009 the NZTA Board confirmed the combined surface/tunnel alignment for the Waterview Connection. The Board was confident that the project's effects could be managed in a fair and reasonable way and that many of the community concerns would be addressed through good design. Over the following two months the NZTA was to provide the Board with details on how a range of issues would be addressed, including:

- the subsequent process of engagement to be adopted with respect to the community and other stakeholders;
- air quality effects;
- open space replacement and enhancement;
- noise mitigation;
- other environmental impacts;
- tunnel design options to minimise or remove the separation between the 'bored' and 'cut and cover' tunnels;
- urban design – including cycle and walkway connections and access; and investigating a 'central' interchange;

Subject to board approval on 27 November 2009 of a final design for the motorway, the NZTA was to lodge a land designation application early in 2010 with Auckland City, for a construction start in 2011-12 and completion in 2015.

=== "Final" alignment confirmed ===
On 21 December 2009, NZTA announced that the tunnels would be built further east as continuous tunnels without an (open) gap halfway, and expressed confidence that they would be able to be completed within the original project budget. NZTA argued that this would be the most cost-effective option for constructing this section, and would require 205 houses to be bulldozed. Underground land would need to be purchased from 105 properties. The board had decided against including a central interchange at New North Road. Construction on the project was proposed to start in mid to late 2011 with an anticipated completion date in the 2015/16 financial year.

The revised route map shows road header constructed tunnels running from Alan Wood Park opposite Range View / Stewart Roads, under the north end of Hendon Ave and under Pak 'n Save, continuing under the ends of Powell St & Craddock St, under the Phyllis St softball fields, under the Oakley Creek waterfall and reserve with a final section of cut & cover under Great North Rd and emerging in Waterview Park as per previous options.

=== "Road of National Significance" and fast-tracking ===
In 2009, Minister of Transport Steven Joyce declared the project one of the "Roads of National Significance". Crucially, this step allowed the application to be considered by a new governmental body, the Environmental Protection Authority, a fast-track process which bypasses normal resource consent and Environment Court processes, in favour of a fixed 9-month process led by a "Board of Enquiry", whose decision cannot be appealed except on points of law. The decision to fast-track was cited as necessary to avoid approval delays which had held up other projects for over 15 years, though local groups were pessimistic about their chance to achieve fair mitigation within the tight process.

The tunnel sections would now be approximately 2.4 km long. Also included in the fast-tracked project was the decision to undertake significant capacity-related widening works on State Highway 16, which are outside of the Waterview area (from St Lukes Road interchange to beyond Te Atatū), which were bundled into the application process which consists of 54 resource consents and 7 designations.

With around 40 folders of materials and plans to go through, local community groups expressed anger in October 2010 that they would have only four weeks to formulate submissions regarding the fast-tracked applications. Calls by Auckland City Council and an affected community board to extend the deadline were rejected on the grounds of the tight statutory timeframe.

== Consent approvals ==
=== Process and hearing ===
The consenting process continued in parallel with the tendering process in order to save time. On 3 September 2010, NZTA's application for designation and resource consents for the Waterview Connection section of the Western Ring Route 'road of national significance project' was referred to a Board of Inquiry.

The EPA publicly notified the application package on 18 September 2010, with the period for public submissions closing 15 October 2010. Evidence needed to be produced and provided to NZTA by 17 December 2010. The Board of Inquiry hearing took 16 days, finishing in March), with the final decision due by 20 June 2011, later amended to 30 June.

A number of matters came into public focus during the hearings process. One of them was the shape and locations of the two proposed ventilation shaft buildings near the northern and southern tunnel entries, and their likely effect on local visual amenity (with the shafts, at 25m-27m height, proposed to tower visibly over surrounding suburban areas) and local air pollution levels (where an independent report considered that the NZTA had been too optimistic in terms of pollution conditions during traffic jams and due to induced demand). Other matters included effects on local neighbourhoods, even those where demolition was not expected, such as for several apartment buildings directly adjacent to a multi-year construction site.

=== Board of Inquiry decision ===
On 9 May 2011 it was reported that the board had directed NZTA to, among other mitigation changes:

- build the northern tunnel exhaust tower on the other (eastern) side of Great North Rd, further away from Waterview Primary School than planned - NZTA had opposed the change arguing extra costs of up to $29 million
- build the southern tunnel exhaust tower, in Owairaka, 70 to 80 metres southeast of NZTA's preferred site, away from a narrow chokepoint in Alan Wood Park, requiring a short extension to the 2.5 km tunnels, also reducing the project's open space displacement - NZTA had opposed the change arguing extra costs of up to $21 million
- build the two towers to a height of "15 metres above ground - not more - not less"
- pay $8 million towards construction of a walk- and cycleway between Owairaka and Waterview, to mitigate open space loss by providing local connections for the communities

The draft decision on the overall project was released end of May 2011, confirming the matters of the earlier direction, with the final result not significantly different when released end of June 2011.

While community groups still expressed negative views about the motorway after the hearings process, many noted that they felt that the tunneling (compared to a 2009 surface alignment) and the added mitigation prescribed on NZTA by the board, had helped to make the result more acceptable for the local communities. While some described the process as a "David and Goliath" fight, most agreed that the board had handled the process well, and listened to local concerns.

== Construction ==
=== Start of enabling works ===
In March 2010, NZTA announced that $10 million enabling works would start at the southeastern end of the route, diverting a sewer line and a tributary of Oakley Creek in preparation for the new Maioro St interchange. While the works would occur on land already designated as motorway, local groups were concerned that the move preempted the consenting process for the main alignment, which still was to happen at that stage.

In October 2010, NZTA signed a contract with Fletcher construction to complete stage 2 of the $40m project at the Maioro Street interchange. In November 2010, NZTA continued to negotiate the acquiring of the Faulkner Collins factory and offices from Stoddard Rd in Mt Roskill under the public works act, in order to make way for the Maioro St interchange connection to Stoddard Rd. Faulkner Collins employees took turns sleeping at the factory, fearing that NZTA would change the locks during the night.

=== Contract awarded ===
16 November 2010, NZTA announced the two shortlisted competitors to construct the project, being two alliances of companies, one jointly led by McConnell Dowell and Fletcher Construction and one led by Fulton Hogan in partnership with Australia's Leighton Contractors. A third consortium led by Baulderstone missed out on selection. As of May 2010, it was known that each of the two remaining tenderers had about 140-150 staff preparing bids for the project, and one tenderer, after the decision, noted that they had spent about $18 million preparing the bid. Construction start was expected to be before Christmas 2011.

In mid-2011, it was announced that the 'Well Connected' consortium led by Fletcher Construction had won the tender, for $1.3 billion. The consortium also included McConnell Dowell Obayashi Corporation, PB New Zealand, Beca Infrastructure and Tonkin + Taylor, as well as five sub-alliance partners and contractors: SICE, Wilson Tunnelling, Downer EDI Works, Boffa Miskell and Warren and Mahoney. The consortium worked on the alliance model, in which financial risks and incentives are shared among all partners.

=== Proposal to relocate northern vent stack ===
In December 2011, the construction consortium proposed relocating the northern stack from the east side of Great North Rd, to the north side of Herdman Street. As the Earth Pressure Balance tunnel boring machine (TBM) would be able to bore much closer to the surface than techniques assumed during the design phase, the cut and cover tunneling technique was not required below Great North Road. That meant that a duct below Great North Rd to a stack on the east side could not be constructed at the same time as the tunnels. The northern location for the stack had been studied earlier but dismissed because of greater cost, and the location had also created concerns among locals due to greater visual effects than that finally chosen by the Board of Inquiry.

=== Enabling works ===
Enabling works began in January 2012 between the Maioro Street interchange and Alan Wood Park and included:

- Establishment activities (e.g. construction zone fencing /project and way-finding signage)
- Removal of properties from within designation
- Construction of two temporary soccer fields (senior and junior), ablution block and a temporary car park at Valonia Street (with field drainage and grass seeding from March 2012)
- Site access for heavy vehicles from Richardson Rd (and 8-metre-wide haul road west through Hendon Park)
- Construction of temporary stream crossings (for construction vehicle access)
- Excavation and temporary diversion of a section of Oakley Creek adjacent to the sports fields to facilitate their construction
- Excavation of new stream channels in Alan Wood Park and temporary diversion of sections of Oakley Creek into the new alignment
- Diversion of utility services around Richardson Road to enable the construction of a road diversion
- Temporary realignment of Richardson Road while building new Richardson Rd bridge.

Local electricity distribution company Vector also carried out enabling works to supply electricity to the tunnel portal sites for construction, and included:

- Installing an 11 kV feeder line from the Chevalier zone substation on Great North Road to the northern portal site to supply the northern portal during construction.
- Installing a 33 kV capable, 22 kV operating, underground cable from the Avondale zone substation on Blockhouse Bay Road to the southern portal site to supply the southern portal and the TBM during construction. This also involved installing a 33 kV capable switchboard at Avondale to connect the tunnel supply to the two 22 kV cables feeding Avondale zone substation from the national grid at Mount Roskill.
- Installing a new 11 kV local feeder line from Chevalier zone substation to the Waterview area, to transfer some existing load off Avondale zone substation, as Avondale could not supply both the TBM and its existing load without overloading.
- Installing a second 22/11 kV transformer at the Chevalier zone substation, as the existing transformer could not supply the northern portal and Waterview feeder lines without overloading.

=== Southern Portal works ===
Beginning July 2012

=== Northern Portal works and Great North Road Interchange ===
Beginning May 2013 (note that works at the northern end will not initially involve tunnel boring)

=== Waterview Tunnel ===
Waterview Tunnel
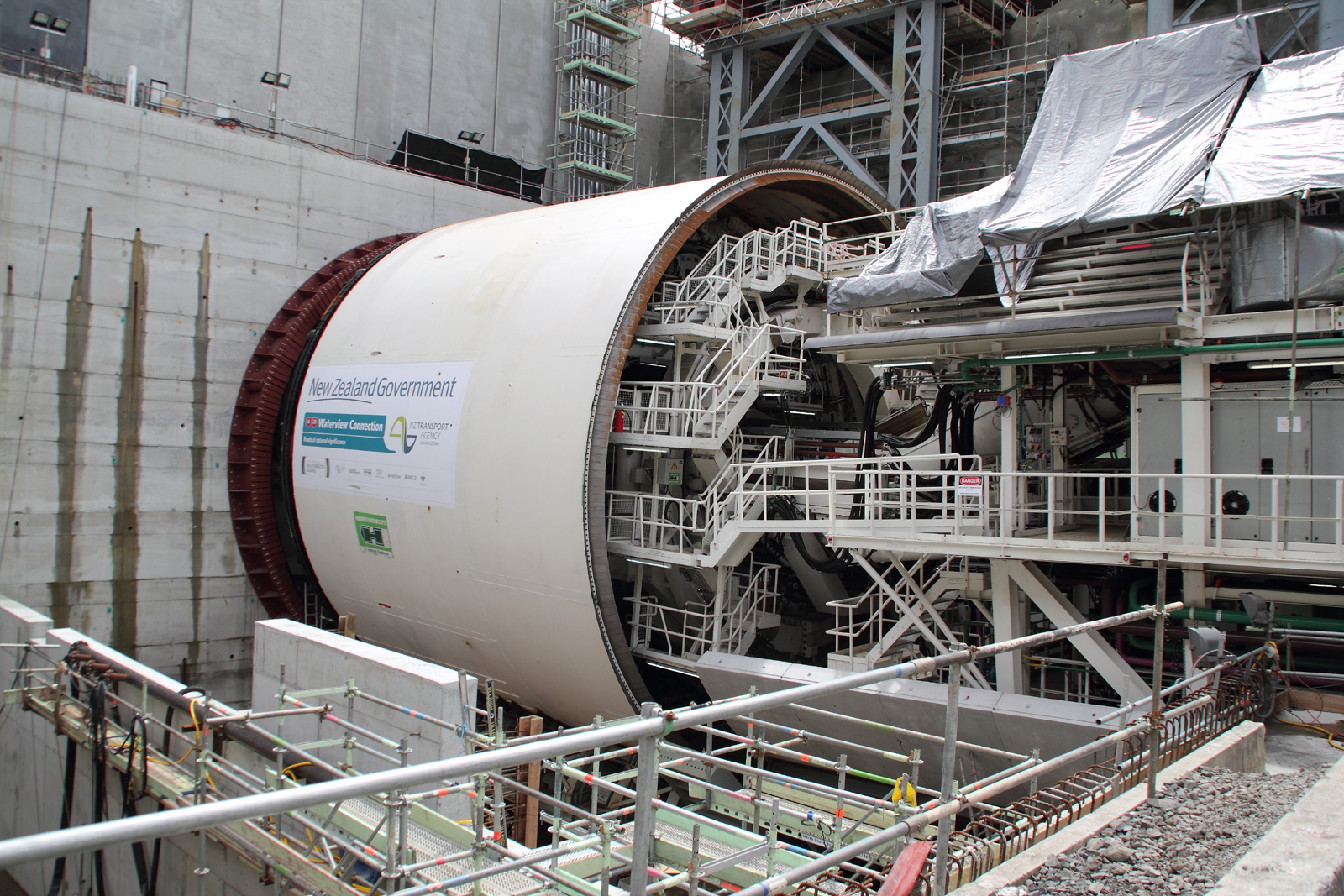
- Alice the Tunnel Boring Machine during the construction of the Waterview Tunnel

Overview
- Official name: Waterview Tunnel
- Location: Auckland, New Zealand
- Status: Operational
- Route: SH 20 and SH 16
- Start: Point Chevalier
- End: Mount Roskill

Operation
- Work began: 2011
- Opened: 2 July 2017; 9 years ago
- Operator: NZ Transport Agency
- Traffic: automotive
- Character: Motorway
- Toll: None
- Vehicles per day: 75,000 (2020)

Technical
- Length: 2.4 kilometres (1.5 mi)
- No. of lanes: 3 per tunnel; Total: 6
- Operating speed: 80 km/h (50 mph)
- Tunnel clearance: Max vehicle height: 4.6 metres (15.1 ft); Internal diameter: 13.1 metres (43.0 ft)

The Waterview Tunnel is a twin road tunnel in central Auckland, New Zealand. At 2,400 metres (7,900 ft) long, it is New Zealand's longest road tunnel. The tunnel, with three lanes of road vehicle traffic in each direction, connects State Highway 20 in the south at Mount Roskill to State Highway 16 in the west at Point Chevalier as part of the Waterview Connection. Its opening completed the Western Ring Route motorway system.

The Waterview Tunnel completed the Western Ring Route which provides a second route through Auckland. For those travelling from North to South (or vice versa) the route enables users to bypass the city centre and reduces reliance on SH1 and the Auckland Harbour Bridge. It also provides a direct motorway link from the central city through to Auckland Airport, a route which has in the past relied on the use of local roads.

Auckland artist Graham Tipene created an artwork named Te Haerenga Hou (meaning New Journey) for the entranceway to the tunnel. The artwork depicts the journey from the Manukau Harbour, past the volcanoes of Te Ara Pūeru /Māngere, Te Hōpua (Gloucester Park), Maungakiekie (One Tree Hill) and Puketāpapa (Mt Roskill), to the feet of Ōwairaka (Mt Albert), following the path of the tunnels. The work also incorporates the story of lovers Tamaireia and Hinemairangi, whose elopement is said to have led to the creation of the region's volcanoes.

==== Tunnel construction ====
A purpose-built factory was constructed in East Tāmaki to produce the 2414 concrete rings needed to line the tunnels. Each ring is two metres wide (length) and 14 metres in diameter. They consist of 10 precast segments, each of which weighs 10.5 tonnes. Five rejected segments were used to create a Soldiers Memorial on the Village Green at Te Kauwhata.

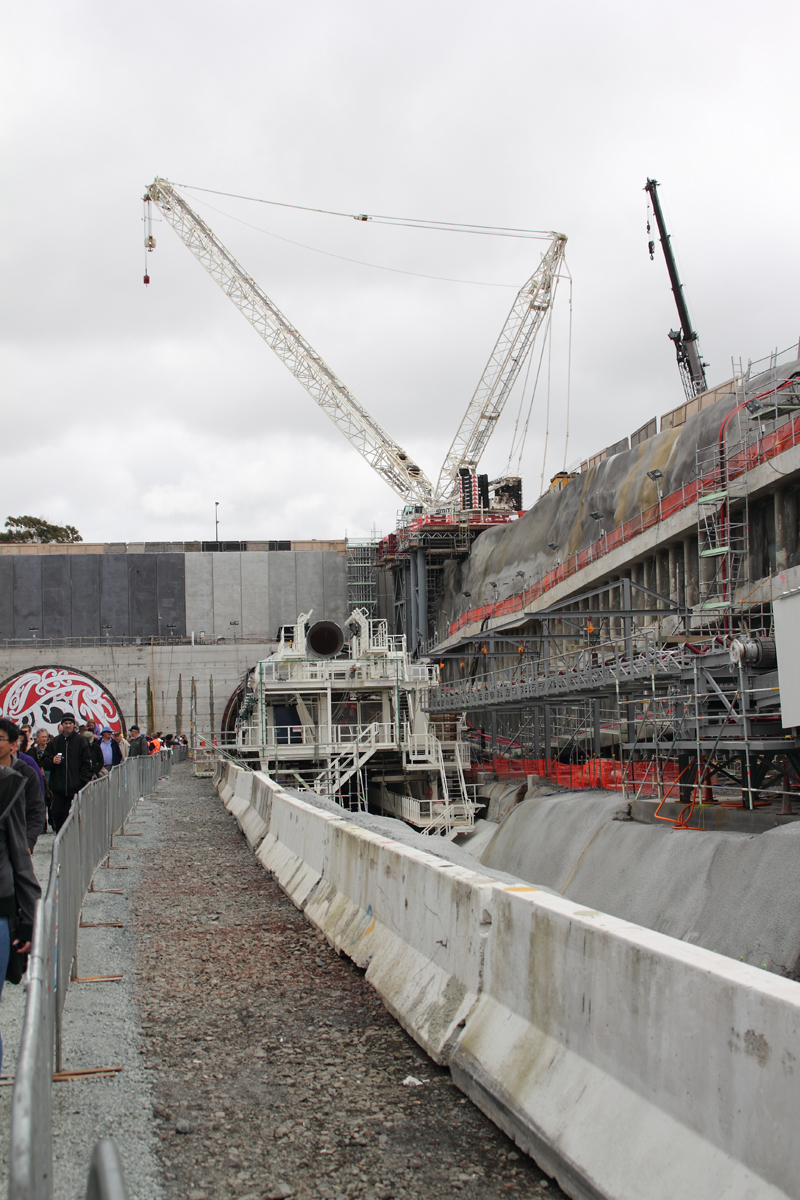
Alice the TBM near the start of her journey in October 2013. Te Hauranga Hau, an artwork designed for the project, can be seen on the left.

An Earth Pressure Balance tunnel boring machine (TBM) was built specifically for the Waterview Tunnel at the Herrenknecht factory, Guangzhou, China. Made up of 90 pieces, the TBM was 14 metres in diameter, 97 metres long, and had a top speed of 80mm per minute. The TBM arrived in Auckland on 22 July 2013, a launch ceremony was held on 31 October 2013, and excavation work began on 8 November 2013.

Nicknamed "Alice" following a public vote, the TBM was the 11th largest machine of this type in the world. Alice bored the twin tunnels in two passes to a depth of up to 45 metres so as to pass below hard rock, the water table, and sea level. The southbound tunnel, excavated from south to north, was holed through on 29 September 2014. Alice completed the return journey on 19 October 2015 and was dismantled in early 2016 before being transported in sections to the Port of Auckland for shipment back to the German manufacturer.

Sixteen cross-passages were built to enable evacuation of people from one tunnel to the other in the event of an emergency and to house tunnel operation equipment. Each cross-passage is around 11 metres long. The excavation was completed in December 2015.

In 2016, the completion date for Waterview Tunnel was estimated as mid-April 2017. A delay was announced in March 2017, with the date pushed out by "two-three months" after faults were found in the deluge system and software. On 11 June 2017, it was announced that the tunnel would open in early July 2017. The tunnels opened on 2 July 2017 with the first cars passing through at 12:47 am escorted by three police vehicles.

==== Safety and maintenance ====
The tunnels include a number of features to ensure safe use by vehicles. Safety features include electronic message boards, speed cameras, public address systems, radio sound systems, CCTV cameras, and ventilation and fire sprinkler systems. Traffic is monitored by dedicated Tunnel Operators and computerised systems. Emergency exits and telephones are installed every 150 metres along the length of each tunnel. Overheight detection systems prevent oversize vehicles entering, and on-ramp signals regulate traffic flow.

The tunnels will be partially or fully closed for scheduled maintenance at times, usually between the hours of 10pm and 5am. A detour route through Great North Road, Blockhouse Bay Road, Tiverton Road, New Windsor Road, and Maioro Street will be utilised at these times. The detour will also be permanently in place for prohibited vehicles.

Dangerous goods vehicles (i.e. those requiring a placard), vehicles over 4.3m high, and vehicles carrying uncovered loads are prohibited from using the tunnels. They are required to take the detour route.

== Opening ==
On 24 March 2017, it was announced that the planned April 2017 opening of the $1.6 billion project was being held up for another two months because of issues with its fire sprinklers. On 11 June 2017 it was announced that the tunnel would open in early July 2017. The tunnels opened at 12:47 am on 2 July 2017, with three police cars leading the first vehicles through the northbound tunnel.

== Mitigation and related projects ==
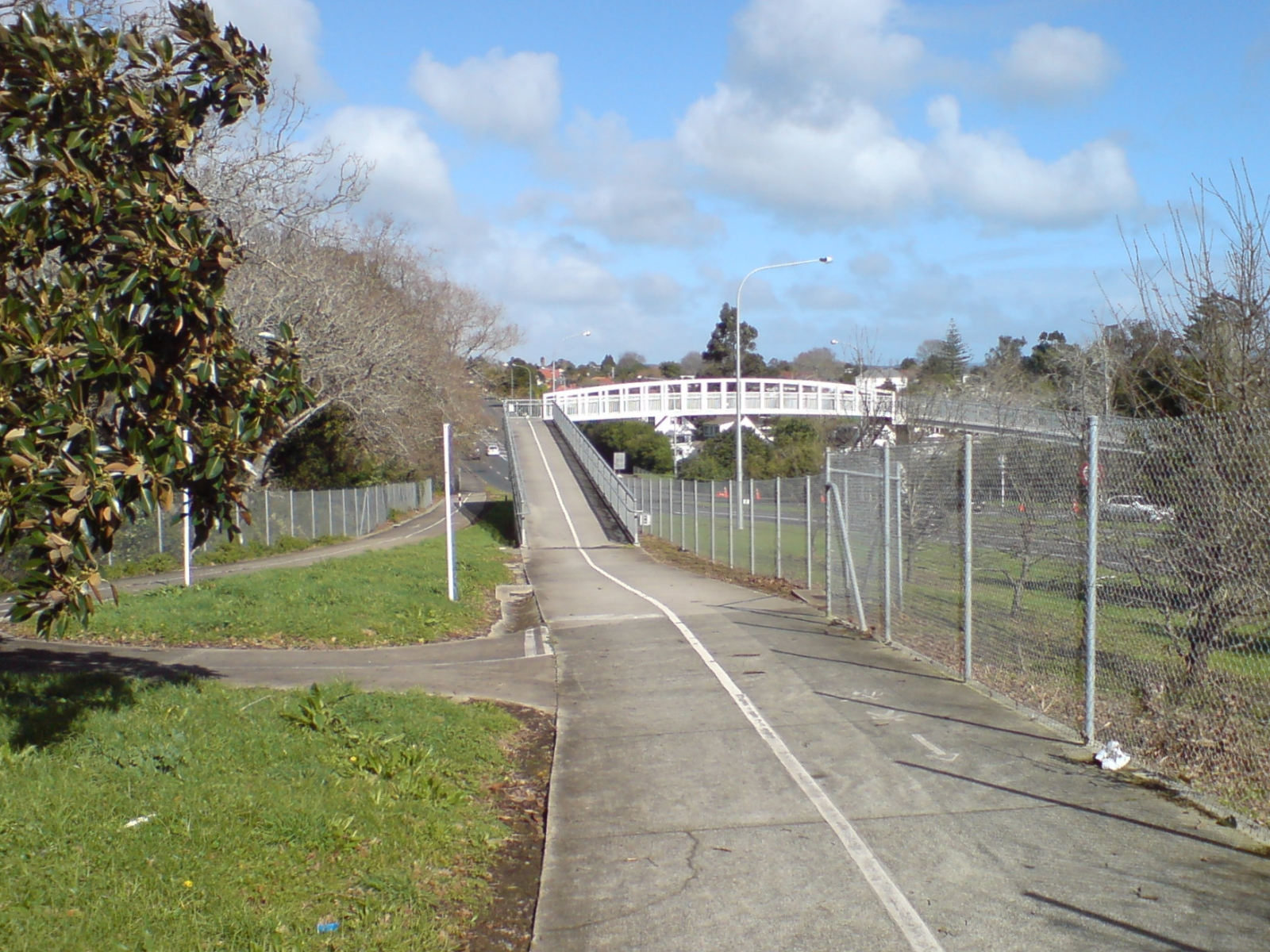
Great North Road and the overbridge of the Northwestern Cycleway. The tunnel will surface just to the west (right hand of the picture).

A number of not directly motorway-related projects will form part of the SH20 connection works, either to mitigate negative effects on the environment, or to provide for other transport modes.

=== Avondale–Southdown railway line ===
Enabling works and allowance for the Avondale–Southdown Line are a part of constructing SH20. KiwiRail sees this route as strategically important as it is the only real alternative for a cross-isthmus heavy rail route, as upgrading of the existing Newmarket Line is not realistically feasible or possible. KiwiRail requested that any tunnel construction not preclude rail above it in the future, nor the possibility of rail being trenched to cross below New North Road to connect to the existing North Auckland Line.

=== Passive open space ===
Passive open space will be lost during construction of the motorway to construction lay down areas and lost permanently where the motorway & associated structures are built. NZTA has proposed replacement passive open space below & around the Waterview interchange ramps, and the existing privately owned empty site adjoining Alan Wood Park and future surface motorway.

=== Active open space ===
The existing fields at Waterview Reserve and Alan Wood Park will be lost. NZTA propose to construct new fields adjacent to the Waterview interchange, and above the tunnel entrances at Alan Wood Park. These would likely be used as construction lay down areas during construction. During the project Expo's, NZTA had proposed to develop additional fields at Phyllis St for use during the construction period but this was dropped for the EPA submission.

=== Walkways and cycleways ===
Documents shown during the public consultation phase in early 2010 showed a proposed walkway and cycleway generally following the line of the motorway / tunnel alignment, connecting the existing SH16 Cycleway with the end of the then-existing SH20 Cycleway, including a walking/cycling bridge over Oakley Creek at Phyllis Street. However, at lodgement time in 2010, NZTA clarified that it would only build cycleways along the sections that are not located in a tunnel, leaving the potential for a connecting cycleway between SH16 and SH20 in doubt.

After a several-months-long hearing process, the Board of Inquiry in mid-2011 however came to the decision that a walkway and cycleway along the tunnel alignment was a required mitigation for open space loss in the areas around both tunnel portals (though not technically as transport mitigation), and that NZTA will have to pay for (though not build) the facility. Cycling advocates Cycle Action Auckland lauded the decision as a resounding win for cycling in Auckland, and a key part in making the Waterview Connection into a truly multi-modal project. The approximate route of the cycleway will be from near Alford Street in Waterview, crossing a new bridge over Oakley Creek, then through Phyllis Reserve, before crossing to Alan Wood Park in New Windsor/Owairaka via a new bridge over the rail line at Soljak Place.

The bridge from Soljak Place over the railway to Harbutt Reserve is the first priority of the Alan Wood Park / Soljak Place to Waterview area cycleway, public consultation to be undertaken early 2012.

Auckland Transport designed the 2.5 km long "Waterview Shared Path" from Alan Wood reserve, with construction happening from March 2016 to mid-2017.

=== Maioro Street to New Lynn ===
As part of the SH20 Mt Roskill extension, NZTA widened Maioro Street from two to four lanes, completed mid-2009. The Auckland City Council was responsible for widening the remaining route to New Lynn, i.e. New Windsor Road, Tiverton Road and Wolverton Road. While it completed some widening of Tiverton Road in 2007, Council deferred completing any more widening until 2015–2020. In late 2011, Auckland Transport called for expressions of interest from contractors to complete the works. Construction was expected to start in the first half of 2012 subject to tender and NZTA funding, and take up to two years to complete. On 17 April 2012 Auckland Transport announced that NZTA would fund 53% of the project.

== See also ==
- List of motorways, expressways, and highways in Auckland
