= Point Chevalier =

- Suburb
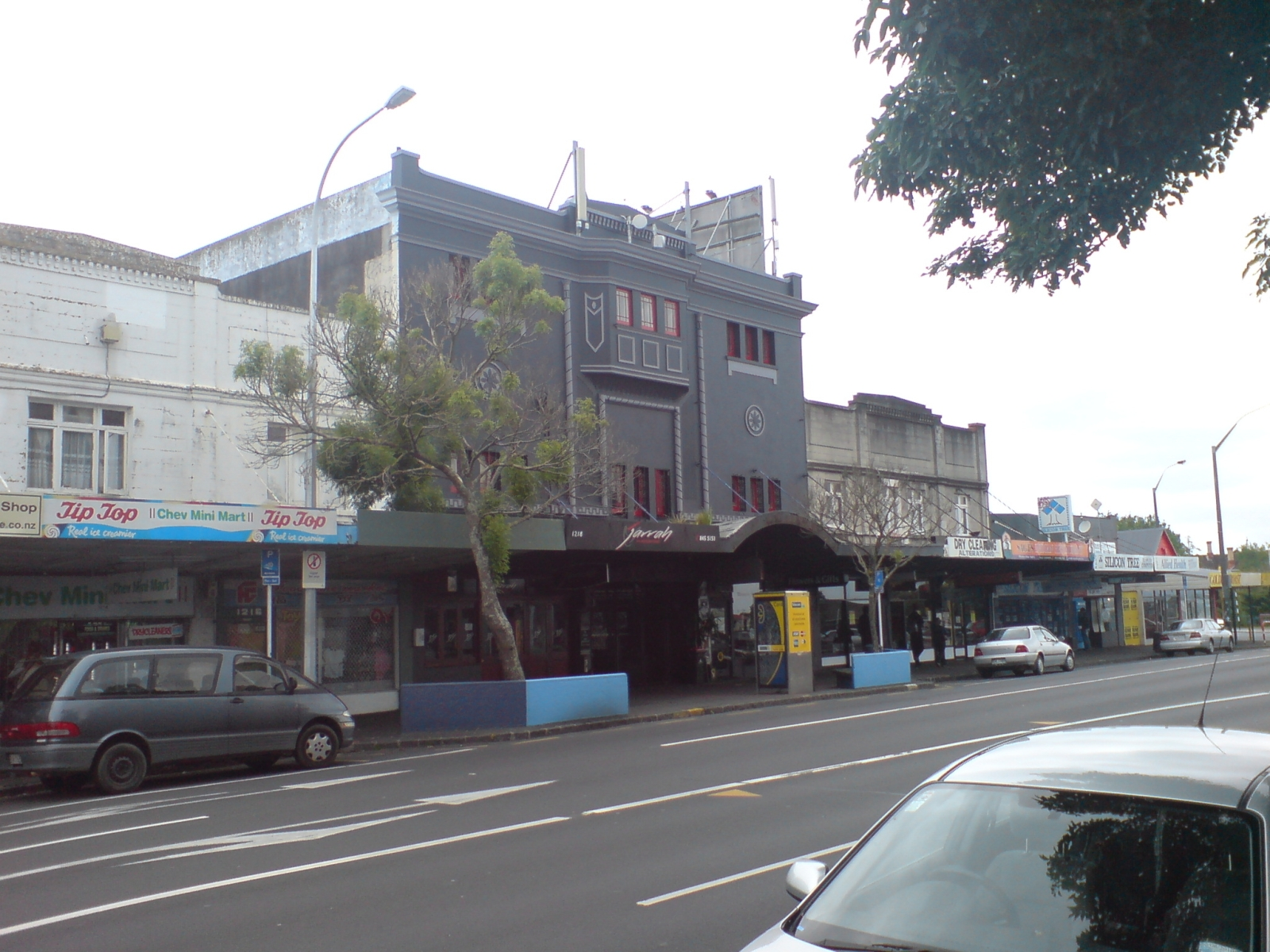
- Point Chev town centre along Great North Road, the old picture theatre is shown in the middle
- Interactive map of Point Chevalier
- Coordinates: 36°51′50″S 174°42′19″E
- Country: New Zealand
- City: Auckland
- Local authority: Auckland Council
- Electoral ward: Albert-Eden-Puketāpapa ward
- Local board: Albert-Eden Local Board
- Established: 1920s (Approx.)

Area
  - Land: 275 ha (680 acres)

Population (June 2025)
  - Total: 8,910
  - Density: 3,240/km^{2} (8,390/sq mi)

(Waitematā Harbour)	(Waitematā Harbour)	Western Springs
(Waitematā Harbour)	Point Chevalier	Western Springs
Waterview	Mount Albert	Morningside

Point Chevalier (/ˌʃɛvəˈlɪər/, colloquially known as Point Chev and originally named Point Bunbury after Thomas Bunbury), is a residential suburb and peninsula in the city of Auckland in the north of New Zealand; located five kilometres to the west of the city centre on the southern shore of the Waitematā Harbour. Similar to adjacent suburbs, Point Chevalier is known for its California style bungalows.

The suburb stretches from the town centre shopping area of the same name on Great North Road near the SH16 motorway, to the tip of the peninsula in the north. Its postcode is 1022.

== Geography ==
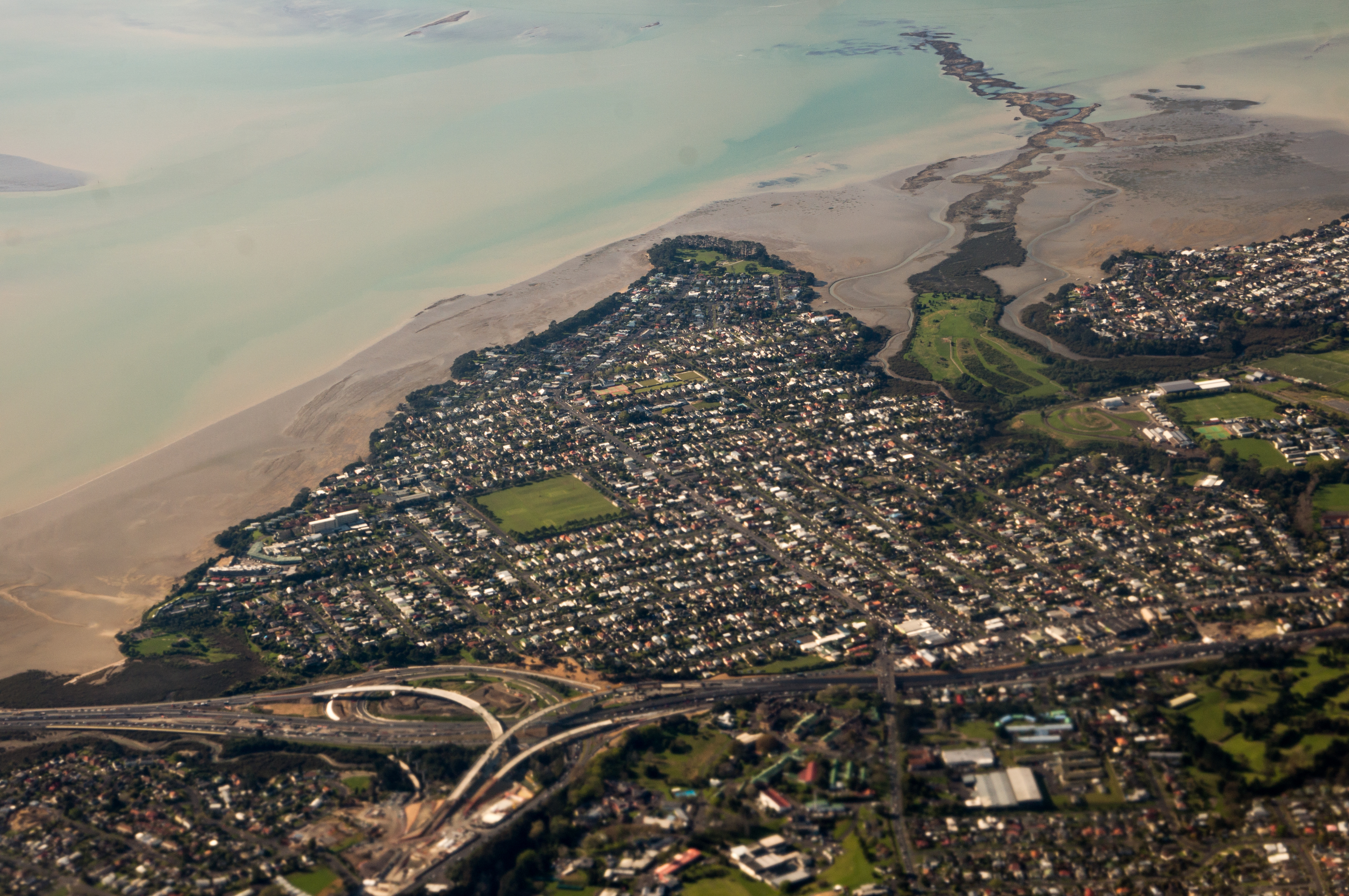
Aerial view of Point Chevalier, looking north. Meola Reef visible top right, construction of Waterview Connection at bottom left

The suburb is situated to the north of State Highway 16 and the campus of Unitec Institute of Technology and to the west of the suburb of Western Springs. It is largely sited on a triangular peninsula which extends north into Waitematā Harbour for 1800 metres. The soil is mostly clay without the overlay of volcanic material which covers much of the Auckland isthmus; this means the vegetation of the area is less lush than some of the other suburbs of Auckland.

Visible from Coyle Park is Meola Reef, situated to the east of the Point Chevalier peninsula and bordering the suburb of Westmere. Meola Reef is an outcrop of black basalt rock which extends some distance north into Waitematā Harbour; the end of a lava flow emanating from Three Kings volcano several kilometres south of this area. Formerly a landfill site, Coyle Park has now been rehabilitated as a park and nature reserve. Other parks in the suburb include Walker Park and Eric Armshaw Reserve. Coyle Park is located at the northern tip of the peninsula.

== History ==
=== Early history and European settlement ===
Before the European settlement of the Auckland isthmus in the 1840s, small Maori settlements existed in the area which later became Point Chevalier, including one at Meola Reef and a fishing settlement at Rangi-mata-rau (later Point Chevalier Beach). The latter was a staging point for shark fishing off Kauri Point on the inner Waitematā Harbour.

The Arch Hill Highway District administered the area from 1871 until the Point Chevalier Road District was formed from part of the highway district on 16 July 1874. The district was dissolved in 1921 when the area was amalgamated into the City of Auckland.

As the city of Auckland grew, Point Chevalier gained strategic importance as it lay on what was then the main land route out of Auckland, the Great North Road. Because of this, a military encampment was located here during the New Zealand Wars of the 1860s. The name 'Point Chevalier' comes from Captain George Robert Chevalier (1825–1871), a musketry instructor serving in the 65th Regiment, stationed at this camp.

The Point Chevalier area had a largely rural character up until the period between the two World Wars.

=== As summer destination ===
Coyle Park and Point Chevalier Beach were popular destinations for family outings during the interwar period, particularly in summer. Tramlines ran down Point Chevalier Road to Coyle Park, near the beach; during summer, special trams were laid on during summer to transport people from Grey Lynn, while buses brought others from Mount Albert and West Auckland suburbs. Following the Second World War, the combination of increased car ownership and the Auckland Harbour Bridge (1959) resulted in a complete reversal of this activity. The once crowded beach was deserted, and the various businesses that had prospered on the summer trade closed down or relocated. Whilst the tramlines were removed during the 1950s, the broadness of Point Chevalier Road - otherwise atypical for a fairly small suburb - and the paved-over roundabout terminus near Coyle Park both remain as evidence of their presence.

Due to sand loss and degradation over the 20th century, Point Chevalier Beach was resanded in 2008 with 16,000 cubic metres of sand from Pakiri Beach pumped onto the foreshore, creating a more usable beach area. The resanding has attracted larger numbers of summer visitors in the years since, making the northern part of Point Chevalier busy (and sometimes congested with vehicles) on fine weekends and holidays and at festival times.

=== Demographic changes ===
Up until the 1980s Point Chevalier's population was largely blue-collar or elderly, the latter particularly due to the Selwyn Village retirement community (one of the largest in New Zealand). Over the 1980s and 1990s the suburb became home to increasing numbers of young families and middle-class professionals. However, 2013 census data suggested that Point Chevalier experienced a strong decrease in its young adult population (ages 20–34) after 2001; analysts have ascribed this to the increasing cost of housing in the central-western suburbs of Auckland.

== Demographics ==
Point Chevalier covers 2.75 km^{2} (1.06 sq mi) and had an estimated population of 8,910 as of June 2025, with a population density of 3,240 people per km^{2}.

Historical population
Year	Pop.	±% p.a.
2006	7,632	—
2013	8,166	+0.97%
2018	8,457	+0.70%
2023	8,535	+0.18%

Point Chevalier had a population of 8,535 in the 2023 New Zealand census, an increase of 78 people (0.9%) since the 2018 census, and an increase of 369 people (4.5%) since the 2013 census. There were 3,927 males, 4,554 females and 51 people of other genders in 3,174 dwellings. 5.7% of people identified as LGBTIQ+. The median age was 41.3 years (compared with 38.1 years nationally). There were 1,590 people (18.6%) aged under 15 years, 1,452 (17.0%) aged 15 to 29, 3,936 (46.1%) aged 30 to 64, and 1,560 (18.3%) aged 65 or older.

People could identify as more than one ethnicity. The results were 80.8% European (Pākehā); 10.5% Māori; 8.7% Pasifika; 11.4% Asian; 2.5% Middle Eastern, Latin American and African New Zealanders (MELAA); and 1.4% other, which includes people giving their ethnicity as "New Zealander". English was spoken by 96.3%, Māori language by 2.8%, Samoan by 1.9%, and other languages by 14.4%. No language could be spoken by 2.1% (e.g. too young to talk). New Zealand Sign Language was known by 0.5%. The percentage of people born overseas was 24.3, compared with 28.8% nationally.

Religious affiliations were 28.5% Christian, 1.3% Hindu, 1.4% Islam, 0.4% Māori religious beliefs, 0.9% Buddhist, 0.5% New Age, 0.4% Jewish, and 1.1% other religions. People who answered that they had no religion were 60.4%, and 5.4% of people did not answer the census question.

Of those at least 15 years old, 3,042 (43.8%) people had a bachelor's or higher degree, 2,808 (40.4%) had a post-high school certificate or diploma, and 1,104 (15.9%) people exclusively held high school qualifications. The median income was $52,300, compared with $41,500 nationally. 1,845 people (26.6%) earned over $100,000 compared to 12.1% nationally. The employment status of those at least 15 was that 3,564 (51.3%) people were employed full-time, 975 (14.0%) were part-time, and 180 (2.6%) were unemployed.

Individual statistical areas
Name	Area (km^{2})	Population	Density (per km^{2})	Dwellings	Median age	Median income
Point Chevalier North	0.72	2,403	3,338	864	42.7 years	$62,800
Point Chevalier East	0.98	3,162	3,227	1,134	36.6 years	$56,300
Point Chevalier West	1.05	2,970	2,829	1,179	47.1 years	$41,100
New Zealand					38.1 years	$41,500

== Architecture and landmarks ==
The Liverpool Estate is a piece of land bordered at one end by Great North and Point Chevalier Roads. Besides housing, it now contains a supermarket, assorted shops and the Point Chevalier Community Library. The estate was created in 1913 by a group known as the Liverpool Estate Syndicate and was marketed as a "last opportunity" to acquire main road frontage close to the city. It was only a fifteen-minute walk to the Arch Hill terminus and a significant selling point was that a motorbus passed by. The Point Chevalier Motor Bus Company ran from 1915-1920 and was owned by prominent locals, including a member of the Dignan family. Following the First World War with the rising price of oil, it went into voluntary liquidation. Estate land was also connected to sewerage and drainage, gas and water were available on the boundary and a school was nearby. Another factor was that it was not far from the "beautiful Point Chevalier beach."

Several of the streets in the Liverpool Estate were named after New Zealand birds – Moa, Huia and Kiwi Roads and Tui Street - and according to the book Rangi-Mata-Rau: Pt Chevalier Centennial 1861-1961, it was a bird-loving (although unnamed) member of the Dignan family who got the honour of naming them.

The houses of the area are predominantly 1920s California-style bungalows and 1930s and 1940s Art Deco houses, which gives the suburb an interesting interwar atmosphere. Rising property values have spurred gentrification and subdivision in recent years, particularly north of Meola Road and in locations near to the water. Towards the northern end of the peninsula there are many houses from the postwar period, and a number of larger architect-designed homes have recently appeared close to Point Chevalier Beach.

There is a certain amount of light industry located in the area, especially close to Great North Road. Up until the mid-2000s car yards were a common land use along this road.

There is a retirement community, Selwyn Village, on the western side, overlooking the Waitematā Harbour. This community is run by an Anglican church trust and includes self-contained houses and apartments, bed-sits, a hospital, and a chapel.

The main shopping area at the intersection of Point Chevalier Road and Great North Road was developed during the interwar period; the most notable of the buildings here are:

- The former cinema (1920s designed by Sinclair O'Connor) later known as the 'Ambassador' theatre, and currently the Ambassador Bar. The bar is owned by sculptor Peter Roche, who works on his artworks in the building.
- ASB Bank: Great North Road. This small neo-classical building is one of the many buildings commissioned by the Auckland Savings Bank from the architect Daniel B. Patterson. Similar buildings appear in Auckland suburban centres and in provincial towns throughout the Auckland Province. As of late 2016, the branch is now closed
- The current Point Chevalier Public Library located at the junction of Point Chevalier Road and Great North Road was opened in 1989.
- The former Point Chevalier Fire Station located on the corner of Point Chevalier Road and Tui Street. This 1920s classical style building is now occupied by a hostel.
- Carrington Hospital is a former lunatic asylum that was Auckland's main psychiatric hospital for over a century. It has a category 1 heritage registration and has had two wings demolished to make way for a road.
- "The Old Homestead", a 19th-century wooden farmhouse, was located until 2013 at the corner of Alberta Street and Point Chevalier Road. It was removed for storage and renovation at Kumeu by its owners, the Homestead Community Church. The church has built a new replica building on the same site.

== Sport and recreation ==
=== Tennis ===
The local tennis club Point Chevalier Tennis Club supports social and inter-club tennis.

=== Association football ===
Point Chevalier is home to Western Springs AFC who compete in the NRFL Premier Division.

=== Rugby league ===
Walker Park is the home ground of the Point Chevalier Pirates club.

=== Sailing ===
Home to Point Chevalier Sailing Club Inc (established in 1919) is one of the oldest sailing dinghy clubs in NZL and still very active with junior sailing programmes as well as racing.

=== Croquet and Bowls ===
The Hallyburton Johnstone Sports Complex in Dignan Street is home to the Point Chevalier Croquet and Bowling clubs.

== Education ==
The main primary school in the suburb is Pt Chevalier Primary School, situated on Te Ra Road with a roll of 622 students. Primary aged children also attend St Francis Catholic School in Montrose St, which has a roll of 269. Both schools cater for year 1–6 students. The first school in the area was Gladstone School in Mount Albert, which opened as Point Chevalier School on 24 October 1887.

The suburb is served by Pasadena Intermediate School (Years 7–8) in Moray Place, which has a roll of 361. The school opened in 1942 to accommodate what was previously called Forms 1–2.

All these schools are coeducational. Rolls are as of July 2026.

Pt Chevalier is served by a large co-ed State secondary school, Western Springs College located in the nearby suburb of Western Springs. Many students also attend Auckland Girls' Grammar School or Mount Albert Grammar School (co-ed). Nearby Catholic state-integrated schools are St Paul's College (boys) or Saint Mary's College (girls).
