= Waterview, New Zealand =

Waterview
- Suburb
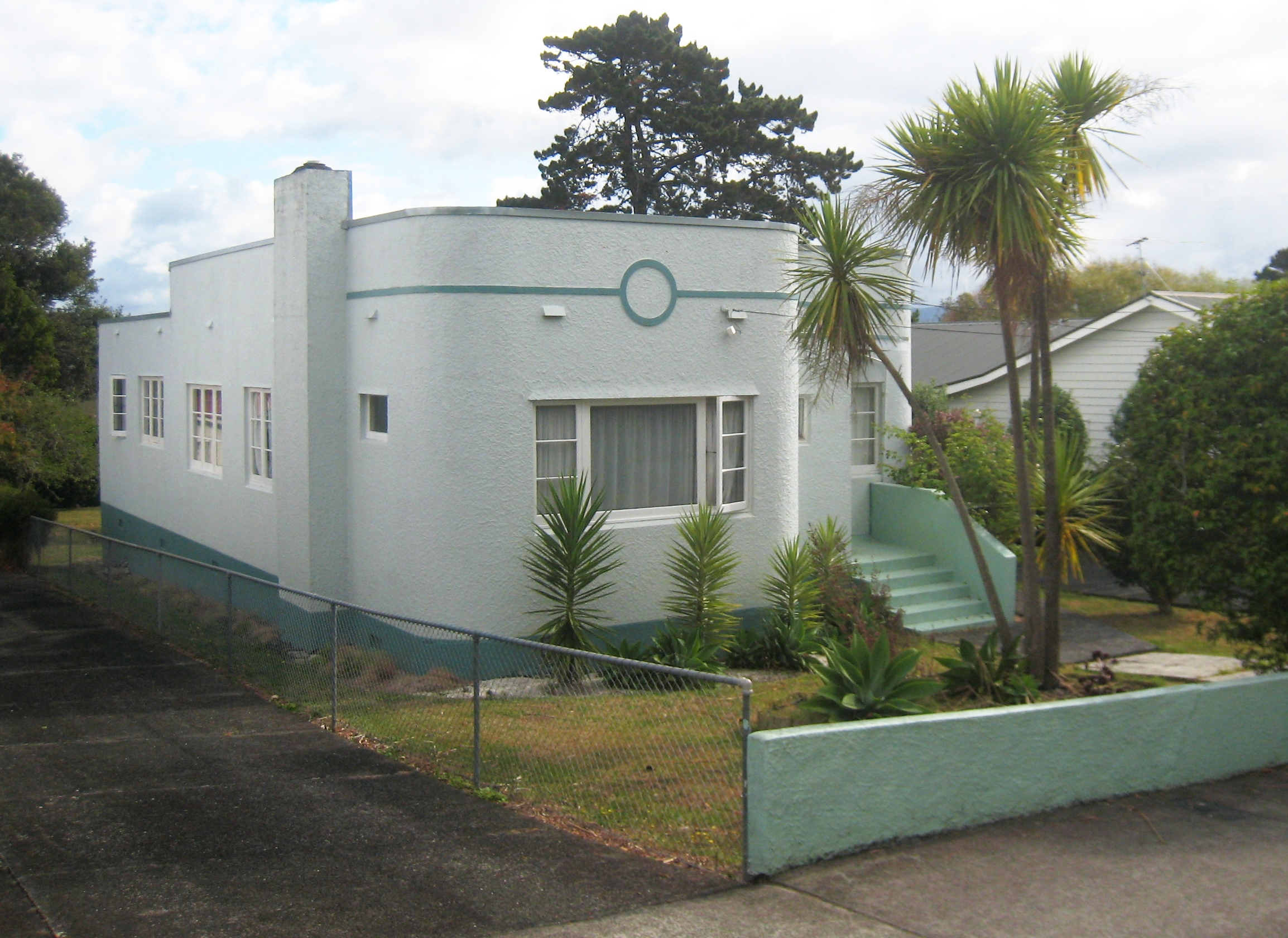
- Waterview contains a variety of house styles, including a small number of Art Deco bungalows.
- Interactive map of Waterview
- Coordinates: 36.88°S 174.70°E
- Country: New Zealand
- City: Auckland
- Local authority: Auckland Council
- Electoral ward: Albert-Eden-Puketāpapa ward
- Local board: Albert-Eden Local Board

Area
  - Land: 112 ha (280 acres)

Population (June 2025)
  - Total: 4,390
  - Density: 3,920/km^{2} (10,200/sq mi)

(Waitematā Harbour)	Point Chevalier	Mount Albert
(Waitematā Harbour)	Waterview	Mount Albert
Avondale	Avondale	Mount Albert

Waterview is a suburb of Auckland, New Zealand, located along the western side of Auckland's isthmus. Its boundaries are Oakley Creek in the east, Heron Park in the south, the Waitematā Harbour (and Motu Manawa (Pollen Island) Marine Reserve) in the west, and the Northwestern Motorway and the Oakley Creek inlet in the north.

== Demographics ==
Waterview covers 1.12 km^{2} (0.43 sq mi) and had an estimated population of 4,390 as of June 2025, with a population density of 3,920 people per km^{2}.

Historical population
Year	Pop.	±% p.a.
2006	3,345	—
2013	3,303	−0.18%
2018	3,375	+0.43%
2023	4,077	+3.85%

Waterview had a population of 4,077 in the 2023 New Zealand census, an increase of 702 people (20.8%) since the 2018 census, and an increase of 774 people (23.4%) since the 2013 census. There were 1,965 males, 2,085 females and 24 people of other genders in 1,470 dwellings. 6.4% of people identified as LGBTIQ+. The median age was 33.0 years (compared with 38.1 years nationally). There were 822 people (20.2%) aged under 15 years, 954 (23.4%) aged 15 to 29, 1,926 (47.2%) aged 30 to 64, and 375 (9.2%) aged 65 or older.

People could identify as more than one ethnicity. The results were 51.7% European (Pākehā); 13.8% Māori; 23.4% Pasifika; 20.1% Asian; 7.7% Middle Eastern, Latin American and African New Zealanders (MELAA); and 2.4% other, which includes people giving their ethnicity as "New Zealander". English was spoken by 92.1%, Māori language by 2.9%, Samoan by 6.0%, and other languages by 23.9%. No language could be spoken by 3.2% (e.g. too young to talk). New Zealand Sign Language was known by 0.4%. The percentage of people born overseas was 35.5, compared with 28.8% nationally.

Religious affiliations were 31.6% Christian, 3.1% Hindu, 5.5% Islam, 1.0% Māori religious beliefs, 1.5% Buddhist, 0.4% New Age, 0.1% Jewish, and 1.5% other religions. People who answered that they had no religion were 48.9%, and 6.5% of people did not answer the census question.

Of those at least 15 years old, 1,155 (35.5%) people had a bachelor's or higher degree, 1,299 (39.9%) had a post-high school certificate or diploma, and 807 (24.8%) people exclusively held high school qualifications. The median income was $44,900, compared with $41,500 nationally. 519 people (15.9%) earned over $100,000 compared to 12.1% nationally. The employment status of those at least 15 was that 1,752 (53.8%) people were employed full-time, 363 (11.2%) were part-time, and 162 (5.0%) were unemployed.

== History ==
The Waterview (Its maori name, Waitango) area, especially along the coast and inlet areas, has a relatively high incidence of archeologically significant areas, from old settlement remnants (both Maori and early European settler), to a comparatively well-retained site of an old mill/tannery and quarry (Star Mill/Garret Bros Tannery) which is scheduled as a Category I Historic Place, and which once used the stream waters to drive a waterwheel.

A large state housing development took place in Waterview from 1944 to 1947.

== Transport ==
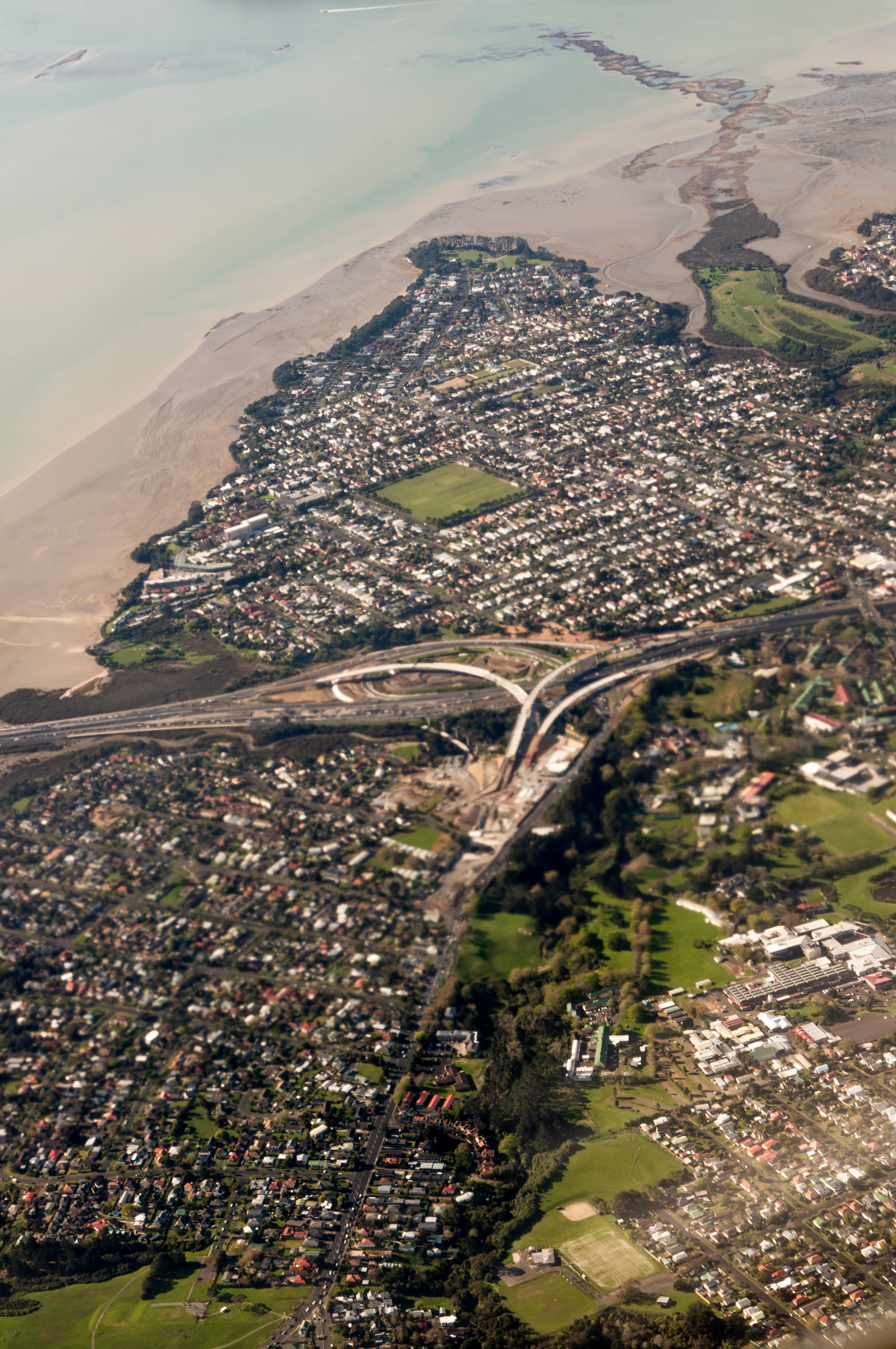
Waterview at the bottom left of the picture, with the Waterview Connection under construction in the middle and Pt Chevalier at the top

A major issue that faced Waterview was the construction of SH20 from Hillsborough through to the Northwestern Motorway. The route through Waterview was highly contentious until (and to a degree after) a fast-tracked Board of Inquiry process consented a route in mid-2011, which placed a new motorway tunnel portal and motorway interchange at the north end of the suburb, causing the removal of numerous homes in the area.

Public transport facilities from Waterview allow access to a range of destinations in Auckland, and a shared walking and cycling path is proposed to link Waterview with Mt Albert and several other suburbs along the State Highway 16 cycle route.

== Education ==
Waterview Primary School is a coeducational contributing primary (years 1-6) school with a roll of 255 as of July 2026. The school opened in 1950. It had to be demolished and a new school built as part of the Waterview Connection.

There is no secondary school in the suburb; nearby state secondary schools include Avondale College, Western Springs College and Mount Albert Grammar School.

== Amenities ==
Howlett Reserve is a local coastal walkway at the mouth of the Oakley Creek as it enters the Waitematā Harbour, around Motu Manawa (Pollen Island) Marine Reserve.
