= Radical trust =

Notion of collaboration in online communities

Radical trust is the confidence that any structured organization, such as a government, library, business, religion, or museum, has in collaboration and empowerment within online communities. Specifically, it pertains to the use of blogs, wiki and online social networking platforms by organizations to cultivate relationships with an online community that then can provide feedback and direction for the organization's interest. The organization 'trusts' and uses that input in its management.

One of the first appearances of the notion of radical trust appears in an info graphic outlining the base principles of web 2.0 in Tim O'Reilly's weblog post "What is Web 2.0". Radical Trust is listed as the guiding example of trusting the validity of consumer generated media.

This concept is considered to be an underlying assumption of Library 2.0. The adoption of radical trust by a library would require its management let go of some of its control over the library and building an organization without an end result in mind. The direction a library would take would be based on input provided by people through online communities. These changes in the organization may merely be anecdotal in nature, making this method of organization management dramatically distinct from data-based or evidence based management.

In marketing, Collin Douma further describes the notion of radical trust as a key mindset required for marketers and advertisers to enter the social media marketing space. Conventional marketing dictates and maintains control of messages to cause the greatest persuasion in consumer decisions, but Douma argued that in the social media space, brands would need to cede that control in order to build brand loyalty.
