= Dale Dougherty =

Co-founder of O'Reilly Media

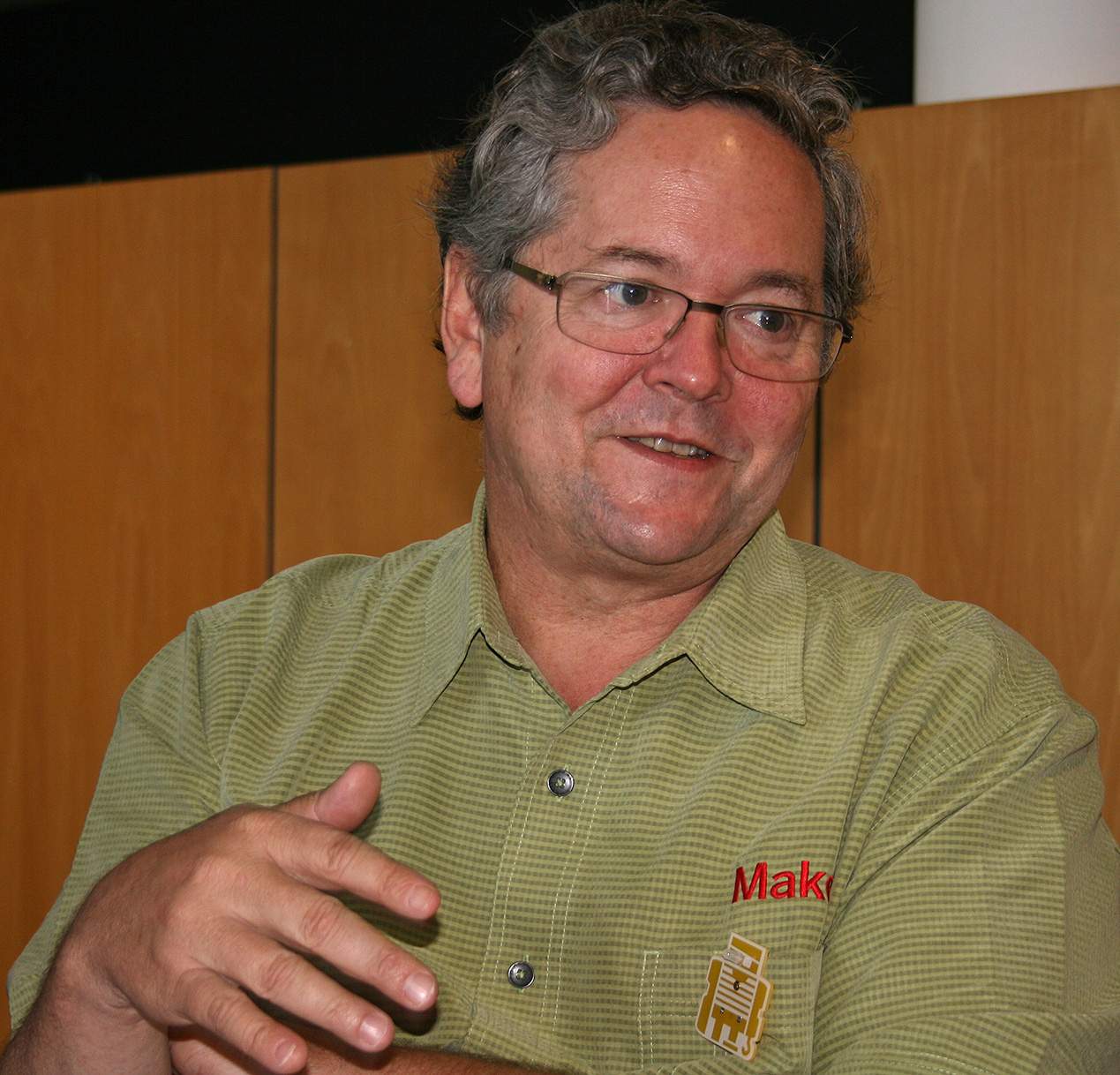
Dougherty in 2013

Dale Dougherty (born 1956) is a co-founder of O'Reilly Media, along with Tim O'Reilly and helped develop O'Reilly's publishing business. He is the author of the O'Reilly book sed & awk.

== Biography ==
Dougherty was the founder, in 1993, and publisher of the Global Network Navigator (GNN), the first web portal and the first site on the internet to be supported by advertising. In 1995, AOL purchased GNN from O'Reilly & Associates. Part of the transaction included an investment by AOL of $3 million for 20 percent of O'Reilly's Songline Studios, which Dougherty ran. The organization published the Web Review and the Music Critic sites on the Internet.

Dougherty helped popularize the term "Web 2.0" at the O'Reilly Media Web 2.0 Conference in late 2004, though it was coined by Darcy DiNucci in 1999.

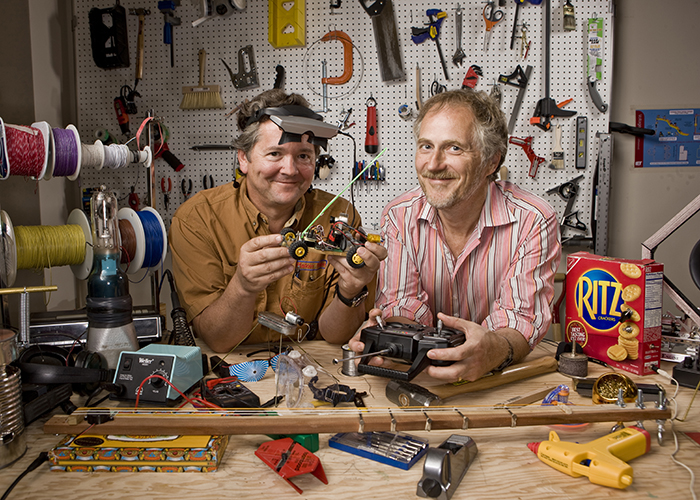
Dougherty, left, with Tim O'Reilly in 2008

Dougherty is considered by some as the Father of the Maker Movement. Dougherty was the CEO of Maker Media, a spin-off from O'Reilly Media. The company published Make magazine, beginning in 2005, had an ecommerce site (Makershed), and conducted Maker Faires worldwide. In June 2019, the company ceased operations and laid off all 22 staff.

In late 2017 Dougherty came under fire for questioning the authenticity of female maker Naomi Wu. Dougherty publicly apologized to Wu for "my recent tweets questioning your identity," saying they represented a failure to live up to the inclusivity that Make magazine valued. Wu herself considers the matter settled.

In July 2019, Dougherty said that he had bought back the brands, domains, and content from creditors and rehired 15 of the laid-off staffers, and would announce the relaunch of the company with the new name “Make Community.”

== See also ==
- Maker culture
- Makerspace
