= International Teletimes =

Early online general-interest magazine published 1992–1995

- Editor: Ian Wojtowicz
- Categories: General interest
- Founded: 1992
- Country: Canada
- Based in: Vancouver, British Columbia
- Language: English
- Website: http://teletimes.com/ at the Wayback Machine (archived May 3, 1998)
- ISSN: 1198-3604

The International Teletimes was an online magazine published from Vancouver, British Columbia, Canada. Founded by Ian Wojtowicz, it began publication in October 1992. The magazine received a "Best of the Net" award from the Global Network Navigator (GNN).

== History and content ==
Ian Wojtowicz, who lived in Vancouver, British Columbia, Canada, created the International Teletimes in October 1992, publishing it on Edgeways, a Vancouver bulletin board system. The initial editions of the publication did not have images or a cover. Wojtowicz hired Anand Mani, a graphic designer, who brought images to the publication. The magazine was published under a shareware model and in three formats: DOCMaker, ASCII, and the World Wide Web (WWW). The web version began in January 1994. English, French, and Esperanto were the languages it was published in.

The International Teletimes is a general-interest magazine and among the initial online magazines of that genre. Each issue is focused on a theme. Previous themes were the environment, television, movies, history, travel, and most-liked authors. Authors write columns about short stories, and food. Tom Davis was the wine columnist. Kent Barrett, a photographer, authored a column for the magazine. People who lived in Austria, Iran, Japan, Portugal, and Russia had penned articles for the publication. In 1995, the publication had around 1,500 readers and its authors and editors did not receive any money.

== Reception ==
The author Neil Randall called the International Teletimes "nicely designed and always interesting". The author David H. Rothman wrote of International Teletimes that "some of the prose could have graced Harper's or the Atlantic". He cited an article by Paul Gribble, a college student, who had taken a train ride during the winter, that said "Every now and then we pass a lake, completely frozen over, flat and white, smooth as a skating rink. I'd love to walk to the center of a big frozen lake like that and just sit there for a while. I'd feel like the first blot of paint on a fresh silk canvas." The Global Network Navigator (GNN) gave the International Teletimes a "Best of the Net" award alongside 11 other web content when Wojtowicz was 16 years old. The Canadian Broadcasting Corporation did a feature on the magazine. The journalist Robert Duncan featured Ian Wojtowicz and International Teletimes on his 1996 PBS documentary "Understanding the Internet".

The writers Bob Powell and Karen Wickre said that the International Teletimes "offers both interesting graphics and a wide variety of well written articles" and said "we think you'll enjoy it." They praised the advice column of Dr. Ignacious Bean as being "More fun than Dear Abby!" A Barnes & Noble Books publication called the magazine "graphically appealing ... though still under constant construction".
