= Jennifer Pahlka =

American political advisor (born 1969)

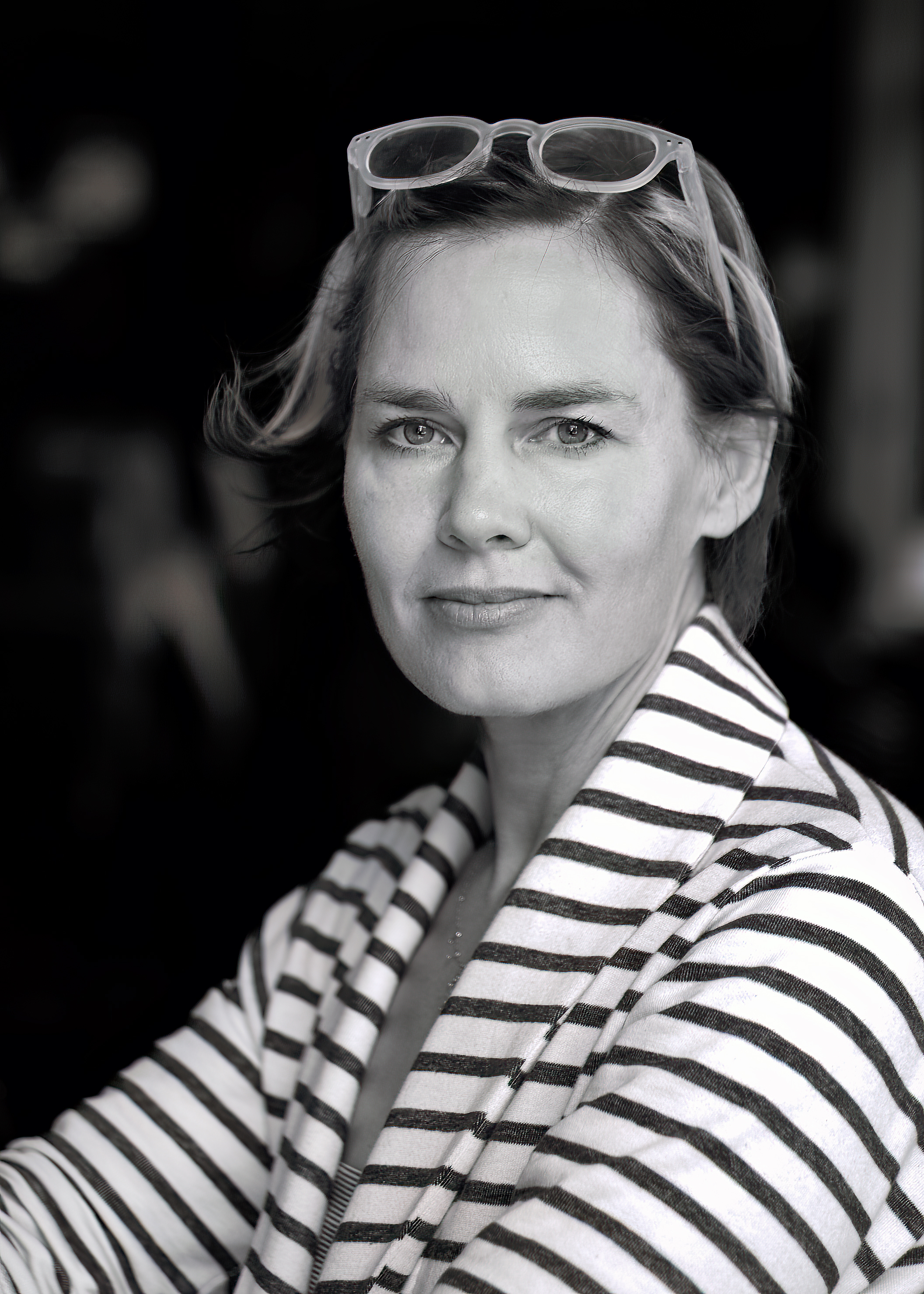
- Pahlka in 2016
- Born: December 27, 1969 (age 56); Port Deposit, Maryland, U.S.
- Education: Yale University (BA)
- Occupations: Businesswoman; author; political advisor
- Years active: 1995–present
- Spouse: Tim O'Reilly (m. 2015)
- Children: 1

Jennifer Pahlka (born December 27, 1969) is an American businesswoman, author, and political advisor. She is the founder and former executive director of Code for America. She served as U.S. Deputy Chief Technology Officer in the Office of Science and Technology Policy from June 2013 to June 2014 and helped found the United States Digital Service. Previously she had worked at CMP Media with various roles in the computer game industry. She was the co-chair and general manager of the Web 2.0 conferences. In June 2023 she released her book, Recoding America: Why Government Is Failing in the Digital Age and How We Can Do Better.

== Early life ==
Born in Port Deposit, Maryland, Pahlka was raised in Austin, New Haven, and New York City. She is a graduate of the Bronx High School of Science and Yale University, where she earned a degree in American Studies in 1991.

== Career ==
Pahlka spent eight years at CMP Media (now part of United Business Media), where she led the Game Group that was responsible for the Game Developers Conference (GDC), Game Developer Magazine, and Gamasutra.com. She oversaw the dramatic growth of GDC from 1995 to 2003. She launched the Independent Games Festival and the Game Developers Choice Awards. She was also the executive director of the International Game Developers Association (IGDA), an independent nonprofit association serving game developers around the world.

From 2005 to 2009, she was the co-chair and general manager of the Web 2.0 events for TechWeb, a division of United Business Media, in partnership with O'Reilly Media. In that role, she proposed the creation of the Web 2.0 Expo, and became the co-chair for the event. She also played a key role in managing the Gov 2.0 Summit and Gov 2.0 Expo.

=== Code for America ===
Pahlka founded Code for America, a San Francisco-based nonprofit organization that aims to make government better for all people. According to the Washington Post it "is the technology world's equivalent of the Peace Corps or Teach for America… [offering] an alternative to the old, broken path of government IT." In her 2012 TED Talk, Pahlka noted that we will not be able to reinvent government unless we also reinvent citizenship, and she asked, "Are we just going to be a crowd of voices, or are we going to be a crowd of hands?"

Although remaining as an advisor and member of the board of directors, Pahlka stepped down as executive director of Code for America on January 31, 2020. Subsequently, she left the board of directors in April 2023.

=== United States Deputy Chief Technology Officer ===
Federal Chief Technology Officer Todd Park tried to recruit Pahlka to run the Presidential Innovation Fellows, a program loosely modeled on Code for America. In May 2013, Pahlka announced that she was taking the position of deputy chief technology officer for government innovation for the United States government's Office of Science and Technology Policy for one year. She described the opportunity as her "own fellowship year of sorts".

In her role as deputy chief technology officer, Pahlka managed Round 2 of the program and organized the creation of Round 3, but her principal goal during her year at the White House was to create something more equivalent to the UK Government Digital Service. She set in motion the creation of the United States Digital Service within the Executive Office of the President.

=== United States Digital Response ===
In March 2020, Pahlka co-founded United States Digital Response, a San Francisco-based nonprofit organization to provide technology volunteers to state and local governments whose systems were unable to respond adequately to the new demands put on them by the COVID-19 pandemic. The organization fielded thousands of volunteers.

=== California Employment Development Department Strike Team ===
In July 2020, California Governor Gavin Newsom appointed Pahlka to co-lead a strike team with California Government Operations Secretary Yolanda Richardson to make recommendations for modernizing the backlogged state unemployment systems. The strike team issued its report in September 2020. Among the problems uncovered by the Strike Team, it was found that poorly designed and outdated fraud protection techniques were denying benefits to millions because of minor discrepancies in documentation supplied by applicants. For instance, a middle initial appearing on an application when the full middle name appeared on a supporting document such as a driver's license, could cause applications to be flagged for manual review, yet adoption of a modern off-the-shelf identity verification system could solve the problem quickly.

=== East Bay Mini Maker Faire ===
With Sabrina Merlo and Corey Weinstein, Pahlka is a co-founder of the East Bay Mini Maker Faire. In comments to The Huffington Post, she made explicit the connection between her work on open government and the Maker movement, saying, "There is a certain generation who have grown up being able to mash up, to tinker with, every system they've ever encountered. So they are meeting their relationship with government in a new way, with a new assumption: We can fix it." As of 2015, The East Bay Mini Maker Faire attracts approximately 7,000 people annually.

== Recognition ==
In recognition of her contribution to digital open government in the United States, Pahlka was awarded an Internet and Society Award from the Oxford Internet Institute. For her work re-imagining government for the 21st century, Pahlka was named a 2011 HuffPost Gamechanger. She was a celebrity judge for the Federal Communications Commission Apps for Community contest, along with Marc Andreessen and Newark Mayor Cory Booker. She was elected an Ashoka Fellow in 2012. In 2012, she gave a keynote speech at South By Southwest Interactive in 2012. In the same year she was featured in TechCrunch's list of "The 20 Most Innovative People in Democracy".

In 2018, Pahlka accepted the Skoll Awards for Social Entrepreneurship on behalf of Code for America. She was featured among the 2018 "America's Top 50 Women In Tech" list published by Forbes.

== Personal life ==
She married technical author, investor, and publisher Tim O'Reilly in 2015. She has one daughter.

As of 2024, Pahlka lives in Oakland, California.

== Publications ==
- Recoding America: Why Government Is Failing in the Digital Age and How We Can Do Better. New York: Metropolitan Books. 2023. ISBN 978-1250266774.
