= Lisa Gansky =

American entrepreneur and author (born 1961)

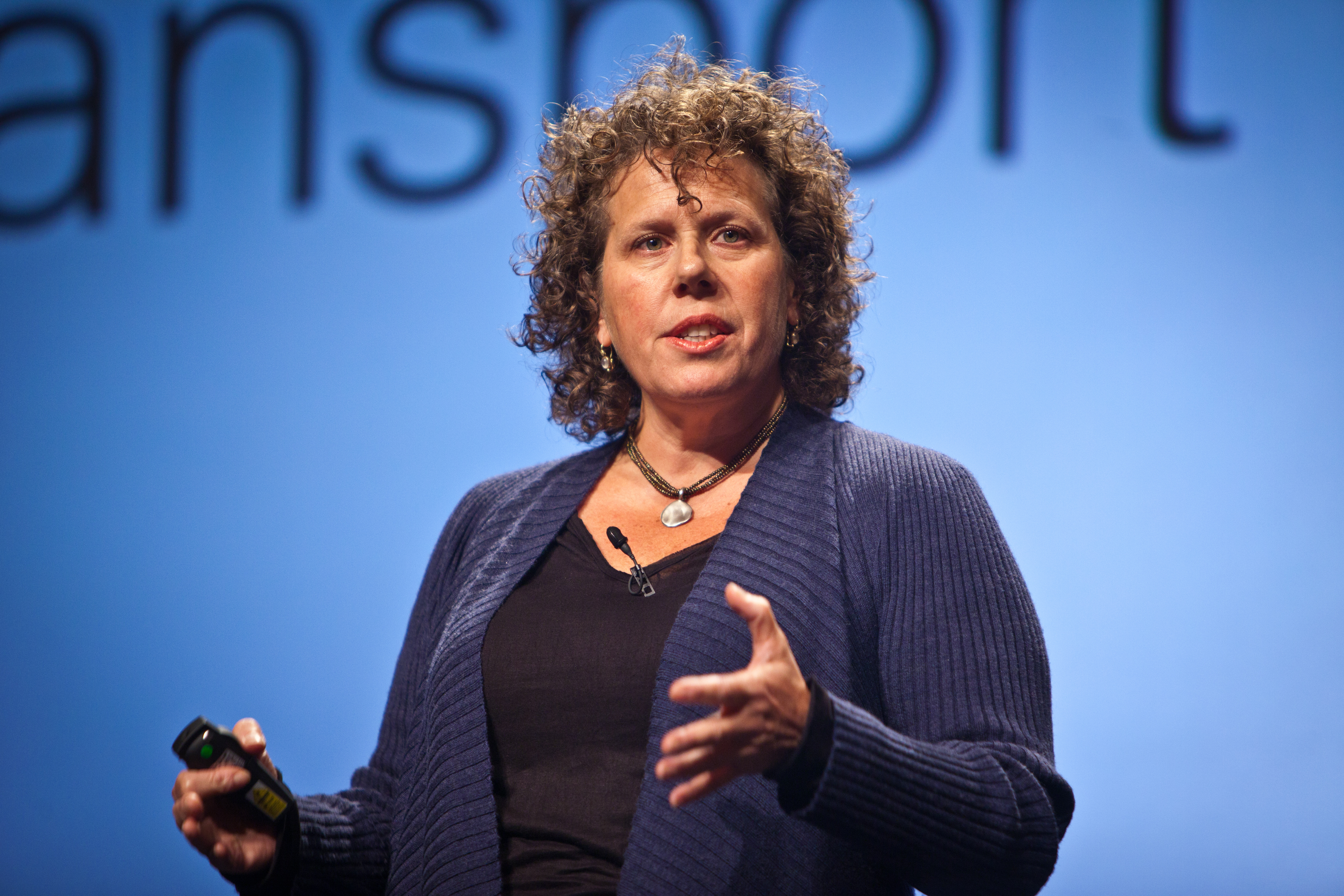
- Lisa Gansky, 2019
- Born: May 1, 1961 (age 65); United States
- Occupations: Entrepreneur, Author.
- Notable work: She was the co-founder and CEO of Global Network Navigator (GNN), the first commercial website, which was acquired by America Online (AOL).; She was also the co-founder, CEO and chairman of Ofoto, a digital photography company.
- Website: gansky.org boundaryless.io pre-alpha.club

Lisa Gansky (born May 1, 1961) is an American entrepreneur and author.

She was the co-founder and CEO of Global Network Navigator (GNN), the first commercial website, which was acquired by America Online (AOL). She was also the co-founder, CEO and chairman of Ofoto, a digital photography company, which sold to Eastman Kodak. She is an international thought leader, writer and speaker on the topic of the collaborative economy or sharing economy, open innovation and entrepreneurship.

== Career ==
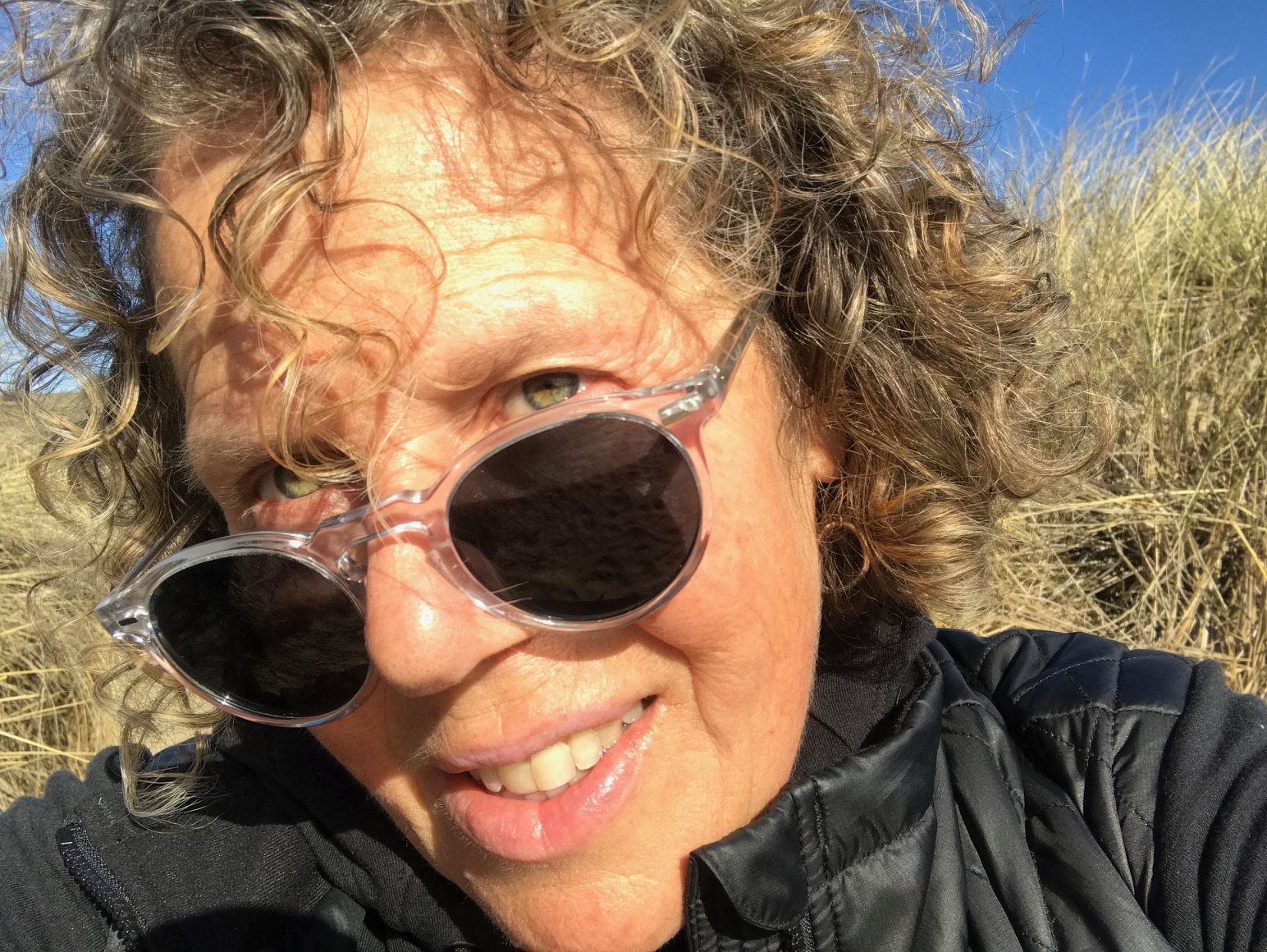
Lisa Gansky, 2019

In 1993, Gansky co-founded Global Network Navigator (GNN), the first commercial web site and portal, with Tim O'Reilly and Dale Dougherty. GNN was purchased by America Online in 1995 while Gansky was CEO of the company. Following the acquisition, Gansky moved to AOL and became Vice President of Internet Properties and Services, overseeing Webcrawler, GNN, internet software, AOL internet investments (ivillage), and online advertising and e-commerce.

In 1999, she co-founded Ofoto, a digital photography company, and was chairman and CEO. During her time as CEO, the company sold to Eastman Kodak in 2001. Following the acquisition, she became general manager of Eastman Kodak Company's Digital Imaging Services division. Ofoto later became Kodak Gallery.

Gansky's book, entitled The Mesh: Why the Future of Business is Sharing, was released in 2010. In July 2010, she launched the Global Share Economy (Mesh) Directory to support the community of share-based businesses and organizations.

In addition to her roles at Ofoto and Eastman Kodak, she has been an investor and advisor to companies including 11:FS, Breather, Clear Cove Systems, Feastly, Greenbiz, Honest Buildings, Instructables, muse.ai, Miso Tasty, OpenRov, Turo, Science Exchange, Scoot Networks, Solar Mosaic, Sunfolding, Taskrabbit, Traity, Bango plc and Trove. She is the founder of Instigating + Co.
