= Code for America =

American non-profit organization

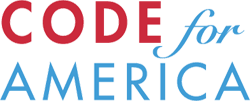
- Founder: Jennifer Pahlka
- Established: September 2009
- CEO: Amanda Renteria
- Endowment: Primary sponsors
- Location: San Francisco, CA
- Website: codeforamerica.org

Code for America is a 501(c)(3) civic tech non-profit organization that was founded by Jennifer Pahlka in 2009, "to promote 'civic hacking', and to bring 21st century technology to government." Federal, state, and local governments often lack the budget, expertise, and resources to efficiently deploy modern software. Code for America partners with governments to help deliver software services, particularly to low income communities and to people who have been left out. "A large population of American citizens in poverty are not connected and exposed to government resources that they are eligible for—nearly US$60,000,000,000 worth of potential benefits for people in need remain unclaimed every year."

Projects that illustrate the organization's impact include:

- GetCalFresh – a portal to access food assistance programs in California that lowered the time to complete an application from 45 minutes to under 10 minutes. Users can access benefits from their mobile device and receive text message updates.
- MNBenefits – a site that allows Minnesota residents to apply for a range of benefits in English or Spanish. Residents can also upload documents and get help via a live chat feature. The site takes what is often an hour long paper process down to a 12 minute task. The work enabled $636 million in benefits for the state that would have otherwise been lost.
- Clear My Record – Software that analyzes large datasets of criminal records and pinpoints records eligible to be erased or dismissed in states like California, Utah, Illinois.
- GetCTC – a streamlined filing tool that enabled low-income families to claim the Child Tax Credit and other tax benefits.
- GetYourRefund – an online service that allows taxpayers to access Volunteer Income Tax Assistance (VITA) services virtually.

== Safety Net Innovation Lab ==
In April 2022, "Code for America received two separate investments, totaling US$100,000,000 over seven years, to set up its Safety Net Innovation Lab and work with state and local government agencies to modernize their social safety net administration services to make access to government services more equitable." The investments were made by Audacious project worth US$64,000,000, and Blue Meridian Partners with US$36,000,000.

The project also includes expanding agencies' digital services to boost participation in assistance programs targeting women, infants and children, and developing an integrated benefits application that allows families to apply for and access benefits all in one location." The project includes partnerships with 15 states, announced in cohorts:

- May 2022: California, Colorado, Connecticut, Louisiana
- March 2023: New York, New Mexico, Maryland, District of Columbia

The remaining states have yet to be announced as of October 2023.

== History ==
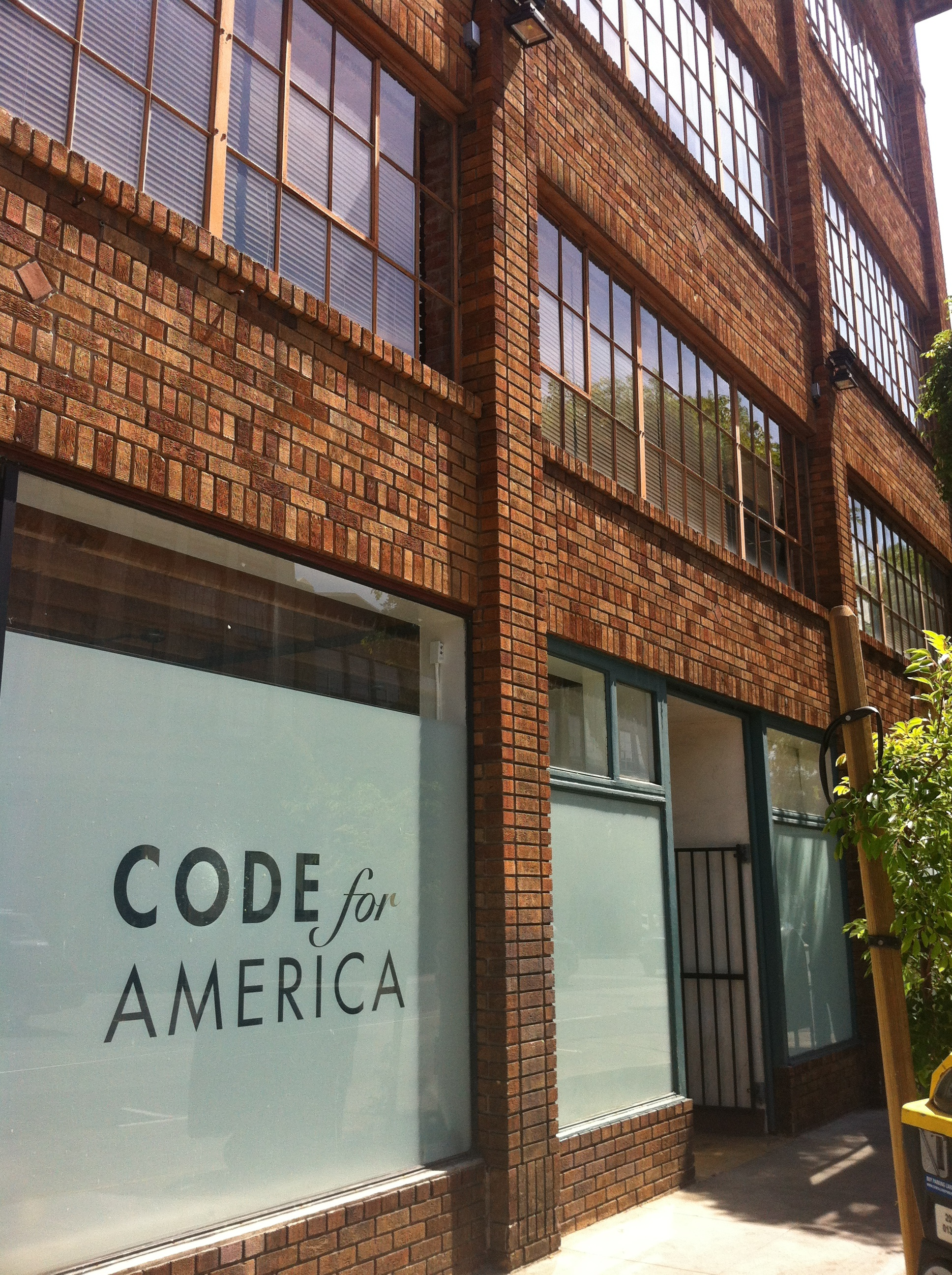
Former Code for America headquarters in San Francisco

In 2009, Jennifer Pahlka was working with O'Reilly Media at the Gov 2.0 Summit in Washington, DC. A conversation with Andrew Greenhill, the Mayor's Chief of Staff of the City of Tucson, sparked the initial idea for Code for America, when he said "You need to pay attention to the local level, because cities are in major crisis. Revenues are down, costs are up—if we don't change how cities work, they're going to fail." The two began discussing plans for a program that eventually became Code for America, "a one-year fellowship recruiting developers to work for city government". With support from web entrepreneur Leonard Lin, Tim O'Reilly of O'Reilly Media, the Sunlight Foundation, among others, the organization was launched in September 2009.

On July 6, 2010, the organization announced it would be recruiting fellows to participate in an eleven month program with assigned cities. Twenty fellows were selected from 360 applicants. Boston, Philadelphia, Washington, DC, and Seattle were the four cities selected to participate in the 2011 program. Fellows partnered with Boston developed an "Adopt a Hydrant" website, so that volunteers in Boston could sign up to shovel out fire hydrants after storms. The system was also used in Providence, Anchorage, and Chicago. Honolulu created a similar website, "Adopt-A-Siren", for its tsunami sirens. A group of 2015 fellows started the GetCalFresh project, which grew into a multi-year project supported by teams within the organization.

In 2012, Code for America started supporting local volunteer groups called Brigades. One of the first Brigades, Friendly Code, was out of Grand Rapids, Michigan. The Brigade network eventually grew to 60 chapters.

In May 2019, Pahlka announced her intention to step down from her leadership role at Code for America. On May 1, 2020, Amanda Renteria was named as the new CEO.

In January 2023, Code for America ended its Brigade Program and began sunsetting affiliation with Brigades. In an interview, Tracey Patterson, Code for America's chief program officer, "Called the brigades a 'big part' of Code for America's history, she said its mission has shifted over the years to the point that supporting dozens of decentralized groups isn't the best use of its resources."

On August 4, 2021, Code for America employees announced their intent to unionize with the Office and Professional Employees International Union (OPEIU) Local1010. The organization officially ratified its first union contract in October 2023. The benefits package "sets a model for technology nonprofits across the country," according to CEO Amanda Renteria.
