= Software maintainer =

In free and open source software and inner source software, a software maintainer or package maintainer is usually one or more people who build source code into a binary package for distribution, commit patches, or organize code in a source repository. If the maintainer stops doing their work on the project, then the development of the project stops. If another person not associated with the maintainer releases a new version of the project, it is said that a fork has been created. So for example happened with uClibc.

Maintainers often cryptographically sign binaries so that people can verify their authenticity.

== See also ==
- Software maintenance
- Software developer
- Code review
- List of software package management systems
