= Ed Niehaus =

Ed Niehaus is an American CEO and publicist.

Along with partners Bill Ryan and Melody Haller, Niehaus founded Niehaus Ryan Haller (NRH) which served the Internet industry during the rapid growth period of the 1990s.

NRH provided public relations services to O'Reilly & Associates' experimental web publishing project Global Network Navigator and was the company Yahoo! chose to handle its public image during the period from 1994 to 2000. In the late 1990s, Steve Jobs approached Niehaus to assist him with his efforts to turn around Apple Computer; NRH became Apple's agency of record.

Niehaus was the CEO of Fluid, Inc., an interactive merchandising company based in San Francisco.

Niehaus is president and CEO of the design firm Cooper and chairman of the board of Collaborative Drug Discovery].
