= Infoware =

Infoware is a term that was coined by Tim O'Reilly and is defined as a website that use commoditized server software such as LAMP to enable data (e.g. book comments and ratings) to be shared via a website, and create a value as a result (e.g. other people's opinions of a particular book that you want to buy). The term infoware was first used in O'Reilly's talk on the subject at the Linux Kongress in Würzburg in 1997, and later in talks such as one at ISPCON 98. It was written up and published as his chapter Hardware, Software, and Infoware in the book Open Sources: Voices from the Open Source Revolution.

== See also ==
- Web 2.0
