= Libraries in virtual worlds =

Information center in an immersive virtual 3D environment

Libraries in virtual worlds are part of an immersive 3D environment that can be used for entertainment and educational purposes. Due to increasing interest in digital services, some libraries and librarians have established virtual services in Second Life and other virtual worlds.

== Second Life libraries ==
Second Life libraries are examples of immersive learning environments. Users can interact with the services in practical ways, such as walking around a virtual space. Libraries in Second Life often put on digital exhibitions as part of their services, for example an exhibit displaying virtual representations of Van Gogh paintings, including Starry Night. The aim of virtual library services is to attract new users to traditional libraries, to establish links with librarians from all over the world, and to support teaching and learning in virtual environments. Most of these services are run by volunteers.

There have been numerous initiatives to create educational spaces within Second Life. There are Victorian areas in which residents dress in period clothes, an Egyptian tomb and a Renaissance Island created by the Alliance Second Life Libraries. Central Missouri State University has also received funding to create a reproduction of 1920s Harlem.

Libraries can also put on virtual events such as conferences, seminars and lectures. In 2008 and 2009 Alliance Library System (ALS) organised a conference called Virtual Worlds: Libraries, Education and Museums Conference. It took place in the New Media Consortium Conference Center in Second Life and was designed to "provide a gathering place for librarians, information professionals, educators, museologists, and others to learn about and discuss the educational, informational, and cultural opportunities of virtual worlds".

Virtual libraries which are independent, run by volunteers and not affiliated with a traditional library are often the most successful ones in Second Life. Second Life-only virtual libraries tend to be more successful than the Second Life branches of public libraries. Users suggest that the libraries in Second Life serve a niche population, which results in difficulties with marketing. Staff of public libraries have different perspectives on SL when they are experimenting with it, which results in general conflict.

In order to have a successful virtual library in Second Life there are six different elements that should be considered. These are:

- Location
- Timing
- Funding
- Techniques
- Organisational baggage
- Computing technology

== History ==
=== Alliance Library System (ALS) ===
Librarians were early adopters of virtual worlds as a platform for information delivery with the Alliance Library System, taking initial steps to create a virtual world library in "Second Life". The Alliance Library System, an Illinois based local library co-operator, providing library services to citizens serves three sectors: libraries, legislators and communities including academic, public, school, and special libraries. In 2006, the Alliance Library System, along with OPAL Online Programming for All Libraries, purchased some land in Second Life and built a virtual library. Librarians started holding discussion groups as well as classes for teens in the library, including courses on podcasting and film-making and an open-mic night. In 2007, ALS created a virtual information archipelago in Second Life called Info Island. Info Island consisted of numerous islands housing various libraries and institutions run by the volunteers as well as information professionals in academic libraries such as the Stanford University Libraries and government organisations such as the Centres for Disease Control By 2007, there were more than 40 libraries in Second Life and the number was increasing as of April 2011. Many of those libraries were found in Cybrary City, part of the information archipelago on Second Life, a place built for libraries to set up virtual services and display resources. Pioneer virtual world librarians were documented by Lori Bell and Rhonda Trueman in 2008

=== Community Virtual Library (CVL) ===
Librarians began collaborating in Second Life as a global professional network which became known as the Community Virtual Library. Libraries were revolutionized by technology during this time and librarians sought new ways to provide programs and services while also learning new skills for 21st-century librarianship. In 2010, ownership of the project was transferred to the Community Virtual Library (CVL) Foundation, a registered 501(c)(3) non-profit organization. All types of librarians collaborated to provide library services including exhibits and educational content. CVL shared an island with Bradley University until January 2018 brought a renovation and move to Cookie Island Library Land where CVL became a project of New Media Arts, Inc. Ongoing programs include writing workshops, book discussions, exhibits (Genealogy, History and other subject areas), reference services, and special groups (art and literary studies). Librarians continue to collaborate on a virtual world bibliography for research and a virtual world database The American Library Association has played a supportive role with virtual world libraries and librarians since 2007 and advocates exploration through the ACRL Virtual World Interest Group which meets monthly at the Community Virtual Library. Programs, immersive field trips, and speakers on information topics are often archived through machinima. Beyond the main branch in Second Life, the Community Virtual Library expanded to other virtual worlds through hypergridding (jumping across virtual world grids). A Hypergrid Resource Library was designed to help users find educational content in virtual worlds. In 2021, CVL became the supporting library for the Virtual Worlds Education Consortium with the goal of providing educational resources in the metaverse- both in Second Life and beyond.

== Virtual World Librarianship: project examples ==
=== CVL Virtual World Database ===
The Community Virtual Library maintains a Virtual Worlds Database which categorizes, describes, preserves, and makes virtual world communities and landmarks more publicly accessible to online users. The Virtual Worlds Database consists of three collections: Virtual World Communities, Virtual World Individuals (Avatars) and Virtual World Landmarks. Landmarks represent a specific space or object. Communities are less tangible and can span many spaces and are more activity and citizen-focused.

=== University College Dublin (UCD) Library in Second Life ===
The University College Dublin (UCD) James Joyce Library created the first Irish library in Second Life in March 2007 as a part of ALS's Cybrary City project. This virtual library had several features and services, including user surveys, e-mail services, e-books, presentations, comment box, virtual PC, notecard giver, trampoline, dance machine and visitor counter. A work group was established for services, technology, staffing and marketing.

=== Caledon Library ===
The Independent State of Caledon is an area of Second Life which is exclusively Victorian-themed which includes a virtual library for "residents". The collections of Caledon Library focus on 19th century, Steampunk and Alternate History with emphasis on role play.

=== Digital Citizenship Museum in Kitely ===
Information literacy has changed and now includes digital literacy and digital citizenship as even young children access information and participate in global digital culture on mobile devices. The Community Virtual Library opened a branch on Cookie Island in the virtual world of Kitely with a Digital Citizenship Museum filled with rooms of exhibits such as Cybersecurity, Digital Citizenship for Kids, Gamification in Education, Curation and Archival of Digital Content, Avatars and Artificial Intelligence, and Social Media Blunders

=== Seanchai Library ===
An example of a virtual world library with the specific purpose of bringing stories to life in an immersive environment is Seanchai Library which is located in several virtual worlds.

== Impact ==
Due to changes in modern lifestyle and consumer behaviours, modern customers may not visit local library buildings. This has become a worry and reason for city councils to cut libraries' budgets. Some libraries, such as ALS decided to take the organisations to their customers, transferring from real life into a virtual world.

In recent years Second Life libraries have held discussion groups and planned events. Participant librarians say that responses have been much higher than they thought they could be. For example, in the early days of ALS establishing a virtual library in Second Life, a surprising number of Residents visited the building, with some even asking reference questions.

According to successful examples, more and more libraries have realised that Second Life is a new and good means to interact with their customers, helping traditional libraries to accommodate new demands and challenges.

== Issues for real life librarians ==
Some "real life" librarians may find it difficult to balance their duties in their online and offline capacities. Librarians are passionate about their commitments to virtual world libraries to the extent that most librarians completed virtual library work at home and are not compensated by their libraries for this work. This could potentially cause problems with stress and fatigue.

Librarians also indicated that adequate computing equipment and faster broadband access is important for increasing the productivity and performance of Second Life libraries, and these requirements limit the involvement of numerous librarians. Additional issues of computing supports include network security programs that help Second Life libraries to solve problems such as appropriate permissions, authentications, limitations of functionality based on security restrictions and service attacks.

Additionally, there are some technology challenges. For example, the use of radio-frequency identification (RFID) – common in most libraries – has become one of the challenges for Second Life libraries. Second Life is sometimes unable to get all the information normally stored on RFID devices such as the means keeping track of library books, people or policies.

== Criticism ==
Some professionals have acknowledged that Second Life offers unique opportunities to expand the horizons of traditional library services. In addition, some university librarians believe that Second Life libraries can be a valuable part of University services, becoming involved in activities such as delivering a downloading service for lecture notes.

Some studies have found that some librarians did not pay enough attention to pre-planning their Second Life libraries, despite librarianship having a culture of planning and management. Most Second Life librarians have no time to manage a Second Life Library during their working time because there is not any official timeline that designed by departments. As a result, Second Life libraries are misunderstood by many people who view Second Life libraries as just games without any educational value. Although the Second Life library is easier to navigate and provides many useful and good materials, the interface is difficult for non-English speakers and volunteers are needed for one to one services.

== See also ==
- Avatar (computing)
- Digital library
- Immersion (virtual reality)
- Library 2.0
- UCD Library
- Web 2.0
