= Naomi Wu =

Chinese DIY maker and internet personality

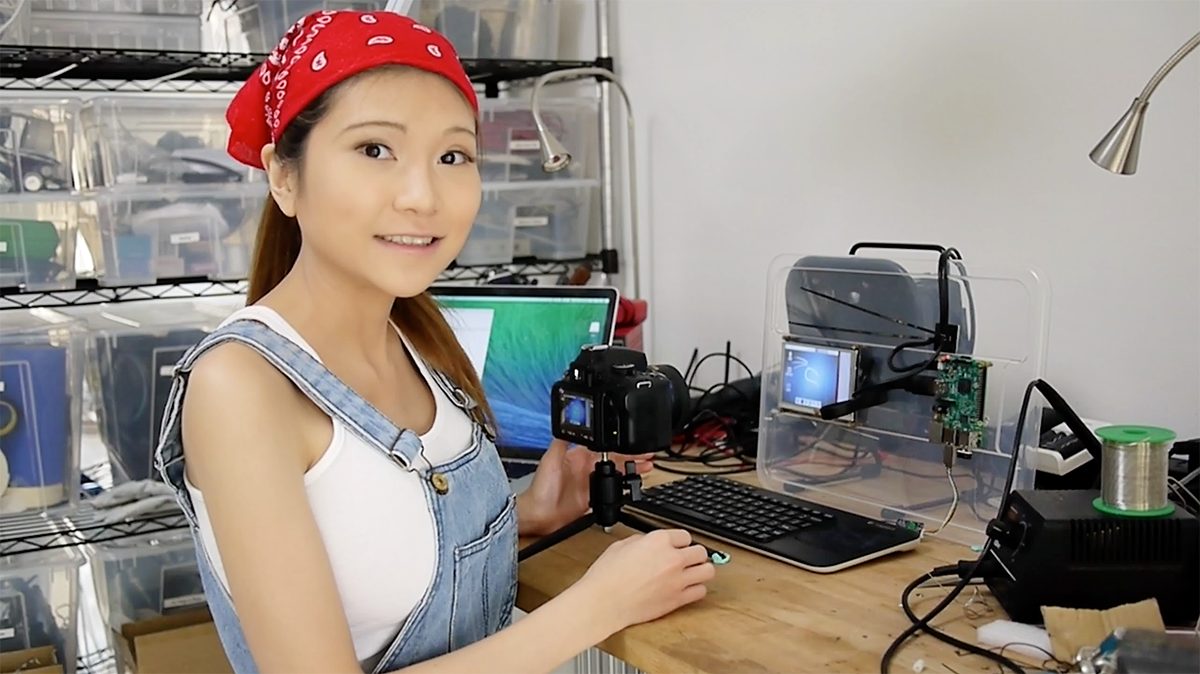
- Wu demonstrating how to configure a Raspberry Pi 2
- Other names: SexyCyborg, "机械妖姬"
- Occupations: DIY Maker; Programmer; YouTuber

Naomi Wu, also known as Sexy Cyborg (simplified Chinese: 机械妖姬; traditional Chinese: 機械妖姬; pinyin: Jīxiè Yāojī; lit. 'Machinery Enchantress'), is a Chinese DIY maker and internet personality. As an advocate of women in STEM, transhumanism, open source hardware, and body modification, she attempts to challenge gender and tech stereotypes with a flamboyant public persona.

== Work ==
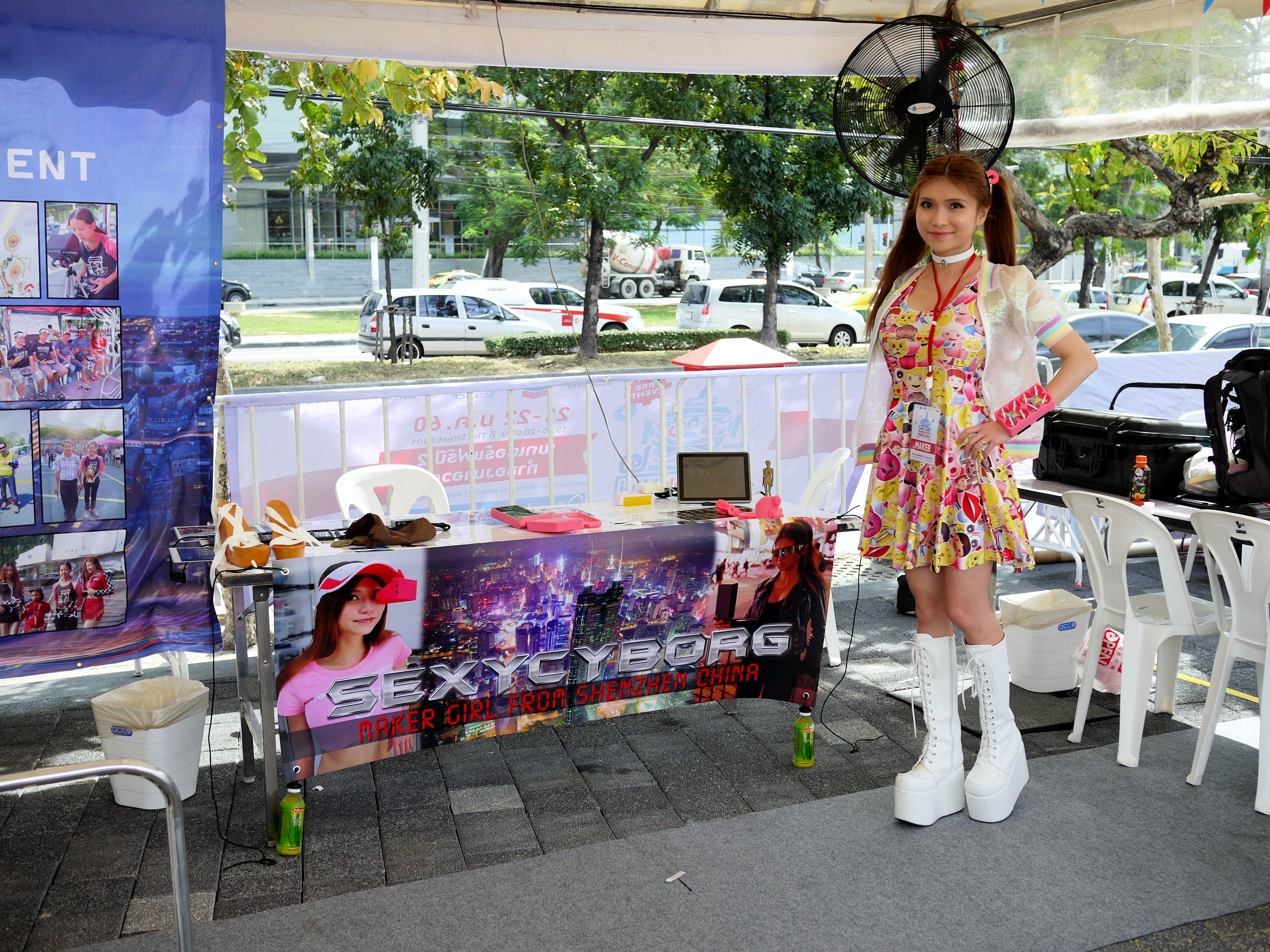
Wu at the 2017 Bangkok Mini Maker Faire

Maneuverable Structured-light 3D scan of Naomi Wu wearing a bikini and 3D-printed hollow wedges.

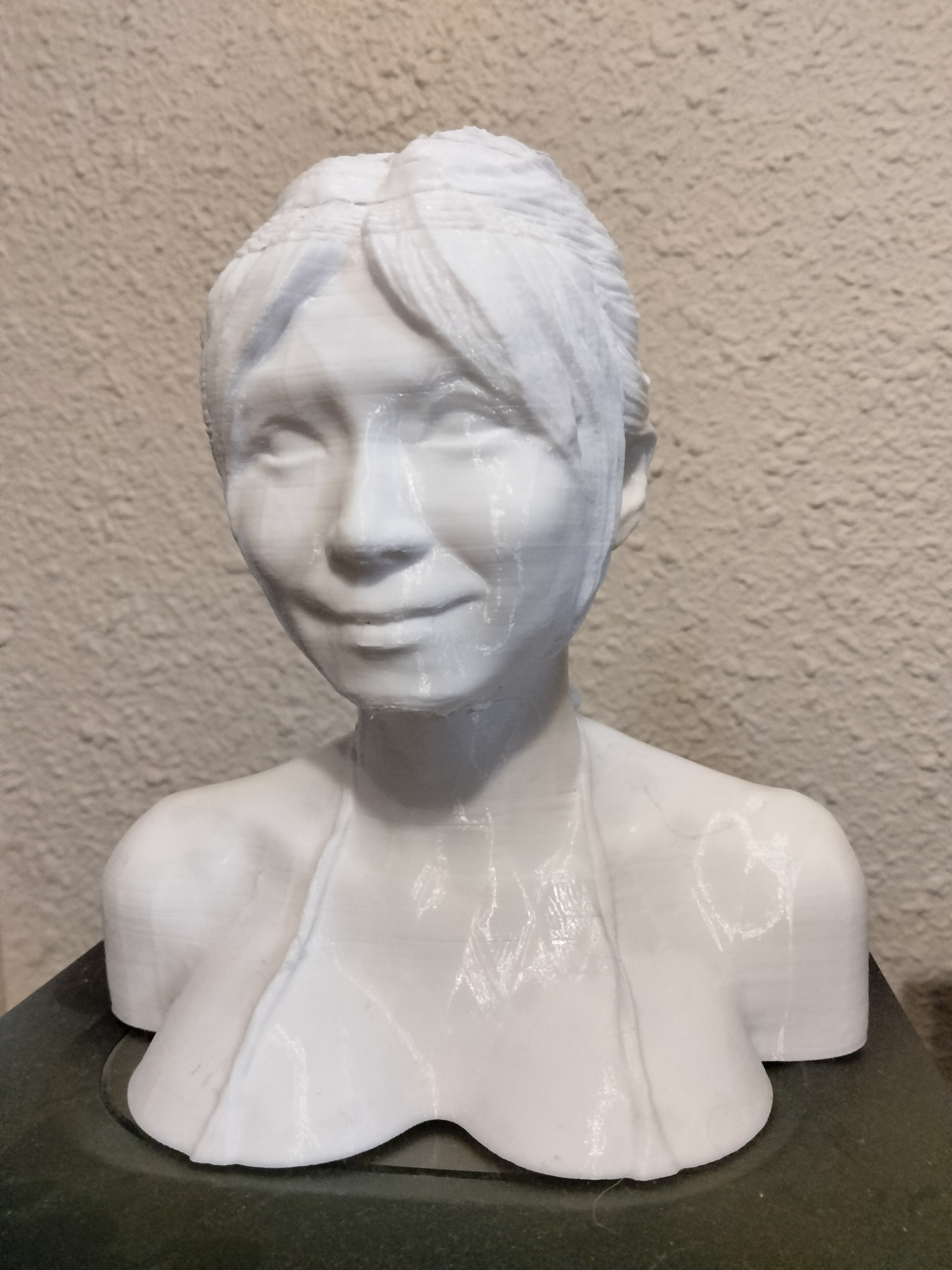
Open source 17 cm 3-D printed bust of Wu exhibiting striations (hobbyist manufacture)

Wu's maker projects often center on wearable technology, including cyberpunk clothes and accessories, along with other projects. One of her early designs (2015) was 3D-printed "Wu Ying" (Chinese for "shadowless") platform heels, with a compartment that hides hacker tools including a keystroke recorder, a wireless router, and lock-picking tools. She explained to an interviewer that women's clothing often lacks pockets, but "chunky platform style shoes that many women in China wear to appear taller—have a lot of unused space."

In addition to her public work as a maker, Wu says she also works as a professional coder in Ruby on Rails, using a masculine pseudonym to protect her identity and preclude gender discrimination; she also reviews electronics. Wu once maintained active Reddit and Twitter accounts under the pen names "SexyCyborg" and "RealSexyCyborg", respectively.

On International Women's Day 2017, she was listed as one of the 43 most influential women in 3D printing, a male-dominated field, by 3D Printer & 3D Printing News. She regards the usage of 3D printing to teach design principles and creativity in the Chinese classroom as the most exciting development of the technology, and more generally, regards 3D printing as the next desktop publishing revolution. She regards "Chinese gadgets" as good as or better than foreign.

On November 5, 2017, Dale Dougherty, the CEO of Maker Media, publisher of Make magazine, doubted Wu's authenticity in a since deleted tweet: "I am questioning who she really is. Naomi is a persona, not a real person. She is several or many people." On November 6, 2017, Dougherty publicly apologized to Wu for "my recent tweets questioning your identity," saying they represented a failure to live up to the inclusivity Make magazine should value. Wu herself considers the matter settled. Wu appeared on the February/March 2018 cover of Make, which also included an article about her experiences with open source hardware in China. Wu was the first Chinese person ever to appear on the cover of Make.

In December 2023, Wu was named as the new maintainer of The Essential Guide to Electronics in Shenzhen, a print book that provides guidance for electronics industry business in Shenzhen and especially Huaqiangbei.

== Vice article ==
In 2018, a reporter from Vice spent three days with Wu in Shenzhen, exploring the city, meeting Wu's friends, photographing Wu's home, and describing in depth the local creative history and Wu's recent creation, the Sino:Bit, a single-board microcontroller for computer education in China, and the first Chinese open-source hardware product to be certified by the Open Source Hardware Association.

The article revealed details of her personal life, which drew criticism from Wu and from others because according to her agreement with Vice, such details should have been left out of the article, out of fear of retaliation by the Chinese government and also to protect her own private life. Vice refused to comply with the agreement and published the details.

After Vice refused to retract the story, Wu created a video in which she made boots with tiny video screens, which displayed the Vice editor-in-chief's home address. Wu's Patreon account was suspended for doxxing. Wu says this temporarily stalled her independent maker career, and she returned to freelance coding for a brief period of time.

== Activism ==
In 2013, the Post-Polio Health International (PHI) organizations estimated that there were only six to eight iron lung users in the United States; as of 2017, its executive director knew of none. Press reports then emerged, however, of at least three (perhaps the last three) users of such devices, sparking interest among those in the makerspace community such as Wu (who had never heard of iron lungs before) in the remanufacture of the obsolete components, particularly the gaskets, and prompting discussion of the regulatory and legal issues involved. Wu hoped to achieve a solution with help from her followers on Twitter and YouTube, saying, "Anything from the 50s and 60s, we can whip up in a makerspace, no problem."

In November 2019, Wu was detained by Chinese authorities for an interstitial Wall Street Journal interview exposé piece on Chinese censorship in an episode of Netflix's Patriot Act with Hasan Minhaj.

Wu considers herself an open source advocate. She states that she has actively been involved in getting multiple 3D printer companies to comply with the GNU General Public License (GPL) when modifying similarly licensed software for their products. In August 2021, she agreed to test the GPL compliance of mobile phone manufacturer Umidigi, which had set up barriers to obtaining their modified Android source code. The company willingly complied.

Wu has criticized Chinese software companies for being slow to address security weaknesses; in particular, several of the Chinese keyboard apps for mobile devices, which can be exploited to leak user keystrokes. Wu has additionally warned that the Signal encrypted messaging app is vulnerable, due to implementation problems and reliance on third-party keyboard apps that may not respect privacy, and suspects that activists in Hong Kong were monitored and detained by police in 2018 after using Signal to talk with media outlets.

Wu's activity on social media has significantly reduced since June 2023, reportedly after receiving a police visit due to her public criticisms of Signal and Chinese keyboard apps.

== See also ==
- Hacker culture
- Maker culture
