= Jennifer Niederst Robbins =

Web designer and author

Jennifer Niederst Robbins has been a web designer since 1993. She designed the web's first commercial site, O'Reilly's Global Network Navigator (GNN).

A graduate of the University of Notre Dame, Robbins is the author of Web Design in a Nutshell, Learning Web Design, and HTML and XHTML Pocket Reference. She has also written corporate identity style guides for clients such as Harcourt Publishing, Americanexpress.com, and OrangeImagineering.

Since 2000, Robbins has lived in Providence, Rhode Island, where she has worked as a freelance designer, teacher, lecturer and consultant through her company Littlechair, Inc. According to the O'Reilly Community site, "She has spoken at major design and Internet events including SXSW Interactive, Seybold Seminars, the GRAFILL conference (Geilo, Norway), and one of the first W3C International Expos." She has taught at Johnson & Wales University and at the Massachusetts College of Art.
