= Web 2.0 Summit =

Former annual tech event in San Francisco, USA

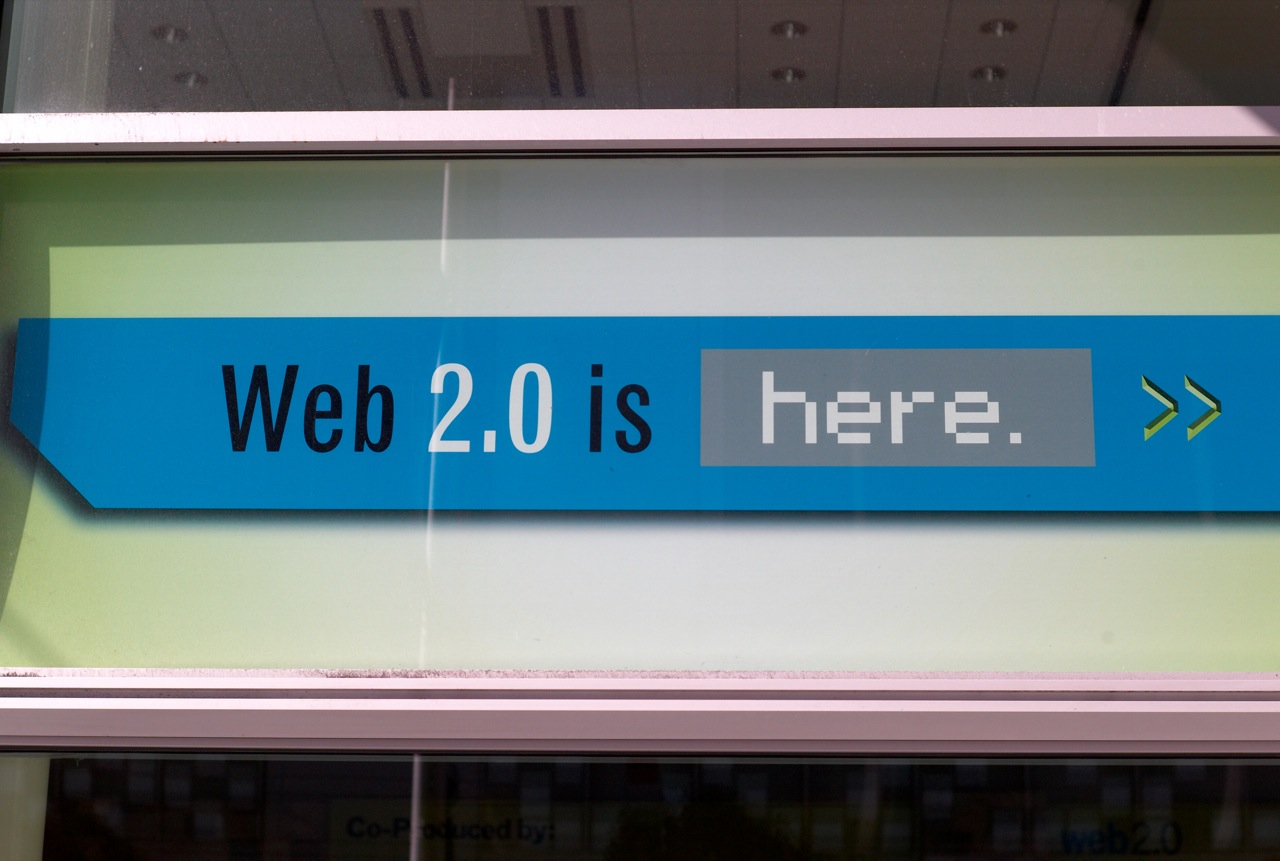
Expo sign

The Web 2.0 Summit (originally known as the Web 2.0 Conference) was an annual event, held in San Francisco, California from 2004 to 2011, that featured discussions about the World Wide Web. The event was started by Tim O'Reilly, who is also widely credited with popularizing the term "Web 2.0". It was organized by O'Reilly's company, O'Reilly Media, with O'Reilly and journalist/entrepreneur John Battelle serving as co-moderators. The Web 2.0 Summit was an invitation-only event and featured many of the most prominent entrepreneurs and thinkers of the web community.

Spin-off events included the Web 2.0 Expo, which lasted from 2007 to 2011, and the Gov 2.0 Summit, which occurred in 2009 and 2010.

== 2004 ==
The first Web 2.0 conference was held October 5–7, 2004 at the Hotel Nikko in San Francisco. It is believed to be the point at which the term Web 2.0 came into popular usage. Darcy DiNucci had coined the term in 1999 and predicted the influence it would have on public relations.

Speakers at the conference included Jeff Bezos, Mark Cuban, John Doerr, Mary Meeker, Craig Newmark, Marc Andreessen, Cory Doctorow, Bill Gross, Lawrence Lessig, Halsey Minor, Louis Monier and Jerry Yang.

== 2005 ==
The 2005 Web 2.0 Conference was held October 5–7, 2005 at the Argent Hotel in San Francisco. Speakers included Stewart Butterfield, Mark Cuban, Bram Cohen, Mena Trott, Joe Kraus, Vinod Khosla, Barry Diller, Mary Meeker, Ray Ozzie, Terry Semel and Evan Williams.

== 2006 ==
In 2006, the event was renamed "Web 2.0 Summit". The 2006 event's theme was "Disruption & Opportunity". It was held November 7–9, 2006 at the Palace Hotel in San Francisco. Speakers included Jeff Bezos, Barry Diller, Joi Ito, Roger McNamee, Ray Ozzie, Eric Schmidt, Arthur Sulzberger, Jr. and Ben Trott.

== 2007 ==
The 2007 Web 2.0 Summit was held November 5–7, 2007 at the Palace Hotel in San Francisco. The theme was "Discovering the Web's Edge". Speakers included Steve Ballmer, Steve Case, John Doerr, Craig Venter and Mark Zuckerberg.

== 2008 ==
The 2008 Web 2.0 Summit was held November 5–7, 2008 at the Palace Hotel in San Francisco. The theme was "Web Meets World". Speakers included Edgar Bronfman, Jr., Al Gore, Arianna Huffington, Vinod Khosla, Max Levchin, Gavin Newsom, Evan Williams, Jerry Yang and Mark Zuckerberg.

== 2009 ==
The 2009 Web 2.0 Summit was held October 20–22, 2009 at the Westin Hotel in San Francisco. Speakers included Tim Armstrong, Carol Bartz, Tim Berners-Lee, Carly Fiorina, Peter Guber, Jeffrey Immelt, Sheryl Sandberg and Evan Williams.

== 2010 ==
The 2010 Web 2.0 Summit was held November 15–17, 2010 at the Palace Hotel in San Francisco. The theme was "Points of Control". Speakers included Carol Bartz, Tony Hsieh, Marc Benioff, Eric Schmidt, Jeff Weiner, Evan Williams and Mark Zuckerberg.

== 2011 ==
The 2011 Web 2.0 Summit was held October 17–19, 2011 at the Palace Hotel in San Francisco. The theme was "The Data Frame". Speakers included Steve Ballmer, Marc Benioff, Dennis Crowley, Michael Dell, Reid Hoffman, MC Hammer, Sean Parker and Christopher "moot" Poole.

== After 2011 ==
The Web 2.0 Summit conference was not held in 2012 because co-organizer John Battelle lacked the time to help organize it while working on the book he was writing. Battelle stated that the conference might continue in subsequent years.

There has not been a subsequent Web 2.0 Summit.

== See also ==
- Web Summit
