= DOCMaker =

DOCMaker is a document creation application for Classic Mac OS, developed by Mark Wall of Green Mountain Software. It is notable for bundling the reader software within the file itself, thus not requiring any additional software to be installed for end-users.
