= Global Network Navigator =

Website

The Global Network Navigator (GNN) was the first commercial web publication and the first web site to offer clickable advertisements. It was designed by Jennifer N. Robbins. GNN was launched in May 1993, as a project of the technical publishing company O'Reilly Media, then known as O'Reilly & Associates. In June 1995, GNN was sold to AOL, which continued its editorial functions while converting it to a dial-up Internet service provider. AOL closed GNN in December 1996, moving all GNN subscribers to the AOL dial-up service.

== As a web portal ==
=== History ===
In September 1992, O'Reilly & Associates published the Whole Internet User's Guide and Catalog. The company then created an online version using ViolaWWW, a web browser that introduced enhanced HTML features such as formatting, graphics, scripting, and embedded applets, and demonstrated a kiosk version that was deployed briefly at the Computer Literacy Bookshop in late 1992.

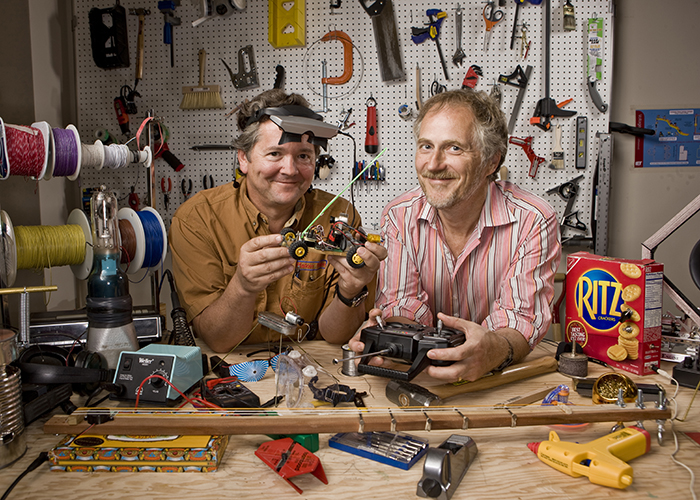
Dale Dougherty, left, and Tim O'Reilly in 2008

In February 1993, the company's CEO, Tim O'Reilly, authorized a four-person "skunkworks" team, led by Dale Dougherty and Lisa Gansky, and began planning for what would become GNN. The website was officially launched in August 1993 at Interop in San Francisco. A press release described GNN as

... a free Internet-based information center that will initially be available as a quarterly. GNN will consist of a regular news service, an online magazine, The Whole Internet Interactive Catalog, and a global marketplace containing information about products and services.

GNN was one of the pioneers of on-line advertising; it had sponsorship links by early 1994. According to Tim O'Reilly, the first advertiser was Heller, Ehrman, White and McAuliffe, a now defunct law firm with a Silicon Valley office. (GNN was not, however, the first to do rotating banner ads; that was pioneered by HotWired in October 1994.) That an online-only "magazine" would support itself by advertising, as GNN planned, was called "remarkable" in a September 1994 review of GNN.

In May 1994, at the First International Conference on the World-Wide Web, GNN was voted the "Best Commercial Site", and was among the top three in three other categories: "Best Overall Sites"; "Most Important Service Concept", and "Best Document Design". The next month, GNN presented its own awards to twelve other websites, as the sponsor of the "Best of the Net" awards at Internet World in San Jose, California. By that time, GNN was being accessed 150,000 times per week, and had more than 30,000 registered users (subscribers). By November the number had risen to 40,000.

By mid-1994, GNN had twelve staff, including sales and marketing, technical, and editorial. By July of that year, GNN had 45 companies as clients, either buying advertising or selling products online at GNN. By year-end, NCSA's "What's New" page, among the most heavily visited web page at the time, was being jointly written by NCSA and GNN, and published on both of their websites. In December, GNN recorded more than 2 million page requests from Web users.

By April 1995, GNN staff had increased to 23. In June 1995, it had more than 400,000 regular viewers, of whom 180,000 were registered subscribers. Advertisers such as MasterCard and Zima paid rates of $110 to $11,000 a week.

=== Operations ===
Dougherty held the title of publisher for GNN until it was sold to AOL in 1995. Jennifer Niederst was GNN's Art Director and the sole designer for the website. Public relations for GNN and its various initiatives was handled by Niehaus Ryan Haller.

Potential readers were advised that they would need "an Internet connection, a World Wide Web (WWW) browser and a universal resource locator for GNN or a local copy of the GNN 'home page' (which is available via electronic mail)." The website was hosted at NEARNET, a project of Bolt Beranek and Newman (BBN) of Cambridge, Massachusetts.

=== Organization of the website ===
The free service was divided into five parts:

- GNN News
- GNN Magazine
- The Online Whole Internet Catalog
- The GNN Marketplace
- Navigator's Forum

==== GNN web directory ====
The Online Whole Internet Catalog - a forerunner of internet directory services like Yahoo! - was described in the August 1993 press release that introduced GNN as a place where "... subscribers can not only read about [Internet websites], they can actually connect to them with the click of a button." The catalog was organized into ten sections:

- The Internet
- Current Affairs
- Science
- Technology
- Humanities
- Arts
- Libraries, Reference & Education
- Government and politics
- Business
- Work and Play

==== GNN Marketplace (GNNDirect) ====
The GNN marketplace included the following sellers:

- Hostelling International (American Youth Hostels)
- Lonely Planet
- Nolo Press

In addition to selling products, GNNDirect provided, in January 1995, an online way for individuals to make donations to the victims of the Kobe earthquake in Japan, via the American Red Cross.

== As an ISP ==
In the Spring of 1995, America Online offered to buy GNN from O'Reilly & Associates. The sale took place in June 1995; AOL paid $11 million in stock and cash.

Lisa Gansky became vice president and general manager of GNN programming after the sale was completed. She moved to AOL from O'Reilly & Associates, where she had been Vice President of Sales. A number of others working at O'Reilly's GNN website also moved, as did the GNN workplace, which relocated to Berkeley. Lydia Dobyns, who had not been with O'Reilly, was hired as vice president of product marketing and service operations for GNN.

When AOL debuted GNN, it was as an Internet service provider (ISP), as a counterpoint to AOL's primary online service, which at the time offered its own content, with limited access to non-AOL Internet websites. The service cost $14.95 per month for 20 hours of Internet access, and the GNN website featured original content in six categories: personal finance, sports, education, travel, Story Cafe, and Web Review.

GNN continued to offer unique content while part of AOL. In November 1995 it announced its second "Best of the Net" awards. In mid-1996 it introduced a three-minute daily audio clip called "Spanq", hosted by "Trip Anchor" and "Uncle Dutch". The show critiqued what was new on the Web, in a format described as "Siskel & Ebert meet Beavis and Butt-Head." GNN Server, a web page server platform (previously NaviServer) and GNN Editor, an HTML editor (previously NaviPress), were both groundbreaking for their time. AOL, which had purchased them, rebranded them and made them available for free on GNN.

In late October 1996, AOL announced that it would offer a $19.95 flat-rate pricing plan for unlimited monthly access to both the Internet and AOL's private network, and that it would fold GNN into AOL. At the time, GNN was the fifth-largest ISP in the U.S., with 200,000 subscribers, a 3 percent market share. AOL had more than 6 million subscribers.

AOL said it would take a charge of as much as $75 million in the quarter ending December 31 to reorganize and shut down GNN. In December 2000, an article in The Wall Street Journal said that AOL had, with GNN, an opportunity to build a competitive Web directory, but AOL had not done that, making possible the success of Yahoo!. (At the time of its initial public offering in 1996, Yahoo! was valued at $848 million.)

In late 1996, AOL closed the Berkeley office of GNN, and laid off about 60 people.
