= Library 2.0 =

Idea for new type of public library

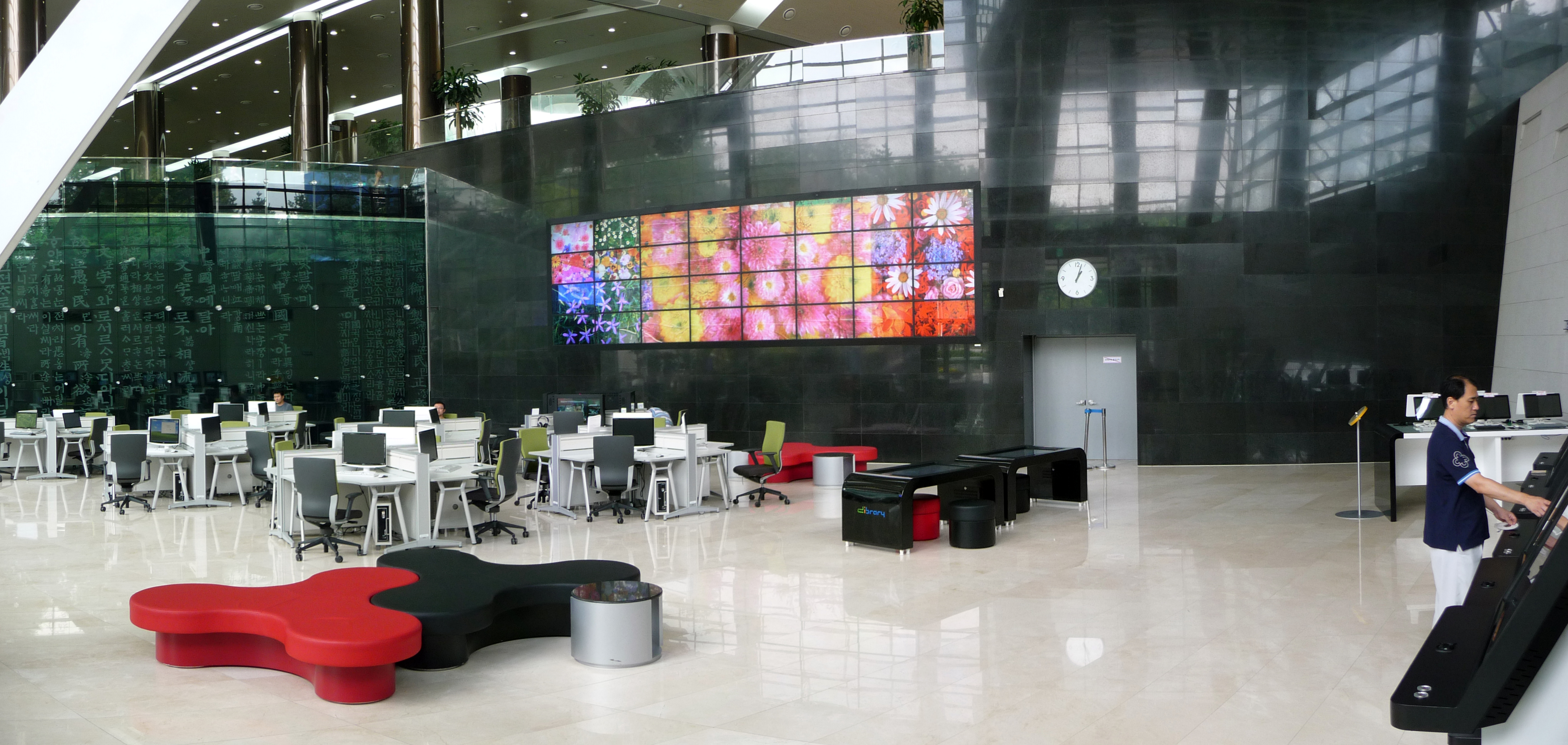
Entrance to the National Digital Library of Korea/Dibrary.

Library 2.0 was a proposed concept for library services that facilitate user contributions and other features of Web 2.0, which includes online services such as OPAC systems. The term "Library 2.0" was coined by Michael Casey in 2006 on his blog Library Crunch.

== Overview ==
Casey suggested that libraries, especially public libraries, are at a crossroads where many of the elements of Web 2.0 have applicable value within the library community, both in technology-driven services and in non-technology based services. In particular, he described the need for libraries to adopt a strategy for constant change while promoting a participatory role for library users.

Library 2.0 made its conference debut at Internet Librarian 2005 in October, 2005, when Michael Stephens of Saint Joseph County Public Library addressed the idea in relation to the typical library website.

A September 2006 article in Library Journal titled "Library 2.0: Service for the Next-Generation Library" begins by expressing the benefit of Library 2.0 to library administrators and taxpayers as providing "more efficient ways of delivering services to achieve greater returns on financial investments." The article continues by asserting that the much discussed Library 2.0 is important for librarians as it may radically change our customer service and interaction.

Major development transpired during the library 2.0 era which other scholars relate it to the web 2.0. and it was between 2005 and 2010 (Noh, 2015). This is where the library begun to utilise the internet to provide digital library services. For instance, the use of Online Public Access (OPAC), social networking such as wikis, podcasts which provided the avenue for the opportunity to interact with patrons using social media platforms making library services more interactive and collaborative. This phenomenon helped to close the gap between patrons and librarians and provide the opportunity for tagging and reviews.

With Library 2.0, library services are frequently evaluated and updated to meet the changing needs of library users. Library 2.0 also calls for libraries to encourage user participation and feedback in the development and maintenance of library services. The active and empowered library user is a significant component of Library 2.0. With information and ideas flowing in both directions – from the library to the user and from the user to the library – library services have the ability to evolve and improve on a constant and rapid basis. The user is participant, co-creator, builder and consultant – whether the product is virtual or physical.

An advantage in pursuing digital services is that the library can target more people - including those who may not have previously used the library service.

A concern that Library 2.0 is trying to address is that potential users turn to Google and Wikipedia because they are "good enough", and perceive libraries to be slow and irrelevant.

== Key principles ==
- Browser + Web 2.0 Applications + Connectivity = Full-featured OPAC
- Harness the library user in both design and implementation of services
- Library users should be able to craft and modify library provided services
- Harvest and integrate ideas and products from peripheral fields into library service models
- Continue to examine and improve services and be willing to replace them at any time with newer and better services.

In 2009, Holmberg et al. identified seven key principles for Library 2.0: "interactivity, users, participation, libraries and library services, web and web 2.0, social aspects, and technology and tools", and offer the following definition for Library 2.0: "Library 2.0 is a change in interaction between users and libraries in a new culture of participation catalysed by social web technologies."

Alex Byrne argues that the use of Web 2.0 strategies in the library context changes the role of librarian into someone who can assist in supporting clients information literacy across the "largely unknown informational universe" rather than helping them navigate the library's own collection.

== Concerns and considerations ==
Some concerns about Library 2.0 relate to access to technology, privacy and security. For example, Casey and Savastinuk suggest allowing patrons to tag or blog anonymously. In 2006, Steve Lawson, humanities liaison librarian, wrote a blog post entitled, "A Library 2.0 skeptic's reading list" that collected links to blogs which discuss these concerns. Lawson says "I'm not anti–Library 2.0 ... I like to think of Library 2.0 as a continuing conversation about the future of libraries, and it makes sense to me to try to round up some voices that challenge Library 2.0 conventional wisdom."

Another concern is that the adoption of Web 2.0 technologies can allow users to spread hate speech and cyberbullying in the library system. It is suggested that librarians define hate speech in their user content policies and identify it when it occurs.

When using social networking through Facebook in a Swedish public library, librarians were described as 'always at the beck and call of Facebook', and capable of losing the relationships they'd built with their clients over the site due to glitches in Facebook.

== Online Public Access Catalog (OPAC) ==
The Online Public Access Catalogue (OPAC) provides the library collection to its users, this is usually done by searching and browsing the library catalogue online. It may be an extension of the Integrated Library Management System (ILS) or independent software.

Library 2.0 is a new way of providing library services through advancing Internet technologies, with emphasis on “user-centered” change and interaction. Like Web 2.0, a full-featured Library 2.0 OPAC improves as more users become involved in the process of interacting with the catalog and sharing content.

Librarians have been working to retool library catalogs in order to make them more useful for patrons to find, organize, and interact with information in a way that has infinite potential for user customization. These new types of catalogs are a shift from "isolated information silos" to "interlinked computing platforms." In the past the information flow was mostly one way, from library to user. With new web tools information can be released to flow in every direction (library to user, user to library, library to library, and user to user).

Jessamyn West, on her librarian.net website, authored "What We Want: An OPAC Manifesto," which broke down the needs of library staff, geeks, and users in their OPAC. These valuable suggestions inform librarians of the flexibility, customizability and plain language approach that is desired by users in their OPAC. Librarians should be aware of these issues so that planning for improvement can begin.

Nishat Kazi recommends that the clients interest area should be recorded when they join the library, and when they login to their account on the OPAC, new items which match their interests should be displayed to them. Kazi also recommends allowing clients to rank and review items in the OPAC, as well as giving other clients the opportunity to respond to these reviews. Key words can also be added by clients in addition to key words added by the librarian to facilitate searching.

== Artificial intelligence and participatory library ==
In China a participatory library named Xiaotu was developed by Tsinghua University. Xiaotu is an artificial intelligence library that allows users to interact with it by talking or chatting through a mobile app or social network. It provides real-time virtual reference service combining Tsinghua University Library capabilities with social network and third-party resources. The system is composed by a self-learning function that receives updates from users as they find some missing or wrong information. Connected to the largest social network in China, it provides easy access and owns a book reading group accessed by Tsinghua University Students in China. Its knowledge base includes Wikipedia and its Chinese counterpart, content revised by professors of the university, frequently asked questions (FAQ) accumulated from the university library, and other third-party resources presented in the Chinese internet.

== Debate ==
Library 2.0 has been a source of debate in the blogosphere. Some librarian bloggers have argued that these key principles are not new and have been part of the service philosophies of many library reformers since the 19th century. Others are calling for more concrete examples of how libraries can get to Library 2.0. Walt Crawford, for example, argues that Library 2.0 comprises a combination of tools and attitudes which are excellent ideas and not new to librarianship, a few business- and tool-focused attitudes which will not serve all users and user communities, and incorrectly places libraries as the appropriate source for all users to gather all information.

Proponents of Library 2.0, such as Stephen Abram, Michael Stephens, Paul Miller and others, have spoken to these criticisms, arguing that while individual pieces of Library 2.0 may not be entirely new, the convergence of these service goals and ideas with many new Web 2.0 technologies has led to a new generation of library service. This includes the use of online social networks by libraries.

Library 4.0 has been proposed as including makerspaces, context-aware technology, open source, big data, cloud services, augmented reality, and state-of-the-art displays.

== See also ==
- Crowdsourcing
- Folksonomy
- Learning 2.0
- Libraries in Second Life
- Library makerspace
- User-generated content
- Web 2.0
