= O'Reilly Media =

American educational publisher

O'Reilly Media, Inc.
- Founded: 1978; 48 years ago
- Founder: Tim O'Reilly
- Country of origin: United States
- Headquarters location: Sebastopol, California
- Distribution: Ingram Publisher Services
- Publication types: books, videos
- Official website: www.oreilly.com

O'Reilly Media, Inc. (formerly O'Reilly & Associates) is an American learning company established by Tim O'Reilly that provides technical and professional skills development courses via an online learning platform. O'Reilly also publishes books about programming and other technical content. Its distinctive brand features a woodcut of an animal on many of its book covers. The company was known as a popular tech conference organizer for more than 20 years before closing the live conferences arm of its business.

== Company ==
=== Early days ===
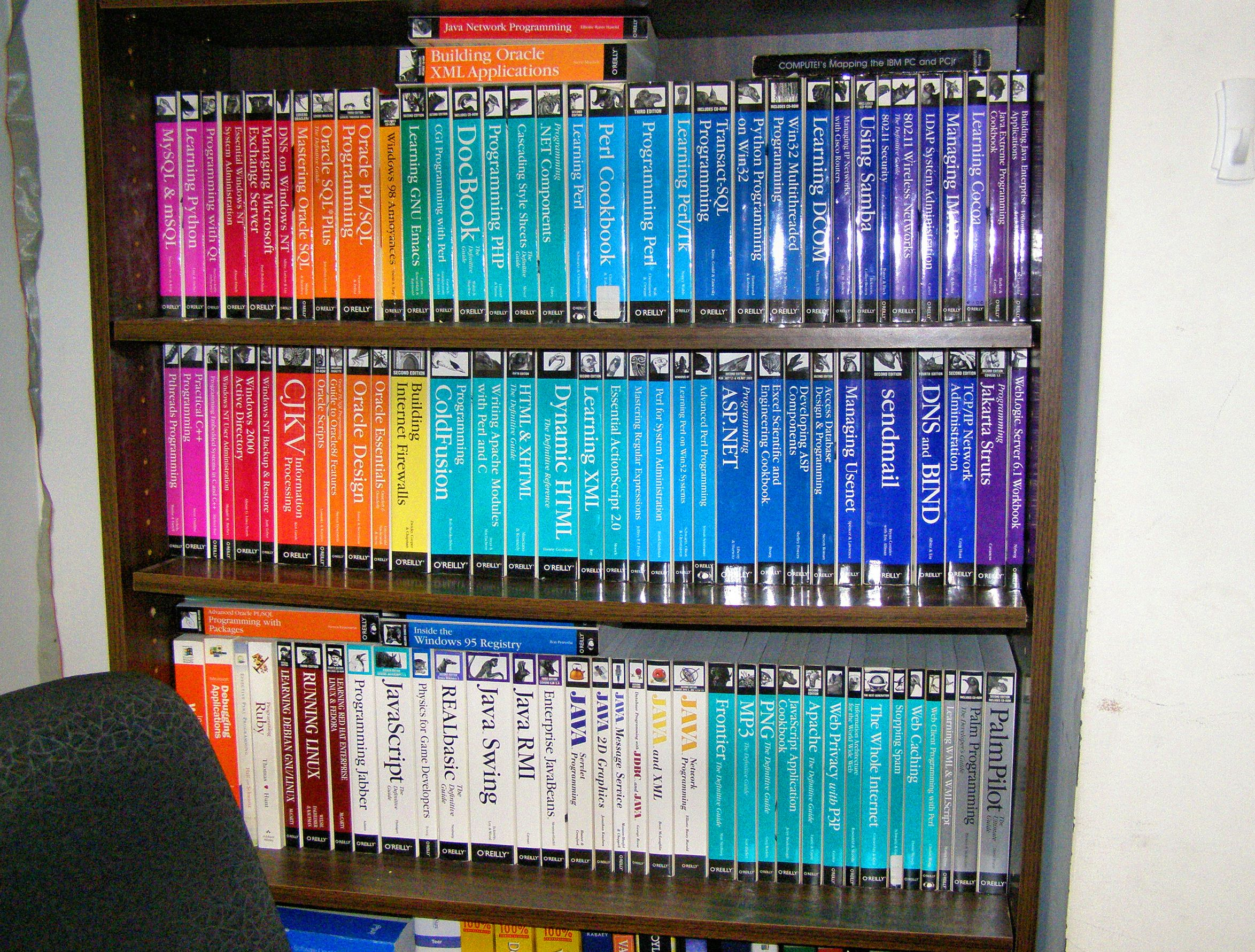
O'Reilly Media is known for its color-coded "Animal Books".

The company began in 1978 as a private consulting firm doing technical writing, based in the Cambridge, Massachusetts, area. In 1984, it began to retain publishing rights on manuals created for Unix vendors. A few 70-page "Nutshell Handbooks" were well-received, but the focus remained on the consulting business until 1988. After a conference displaying O'Reilly's preliminary Xlib manuals attracted significant attention, the company began increasing production of manuals and books. The original cover art consisted of animal designs developed by Edie Freedman because she thought that Unix program names sounded like "weird animals".

=== Global Network Navigator ===
In 1993 O'Reilly Media created the first web portal, when they launched one of the first Web-based resources, Global Network Navigator (GNN). GNN was sold to AOL in 1995, in one of the first large transactions of the dot-com bubble. GNN was the first site on the World Wide Web to feature paid advertising.

=== Conferences ===
From 1997 to 2020, O'Reilly was known for producing tech conferences focused on areas ranging from software architecture, AI, big data, web development, design and more.

In March 2020, O'Reilly announced they would be closing the live conferences arm of their business.

Although O'Reilly Media got its start in publishing, roughly two decades after its genesis the company expanded into event production. In 1997, O'Reilly launched The Perl Conference to cross-promote its books on the Perl programming language. Many of the company's other software bestsellers were also on topics that did not attract much attention of the commercial software industry. In 1998, O'Reilly invited many of the leaders of software projects to a meeting. Originally called the freeware summit, the meeting became known as the Open Source Summit. The O'Reilly Open Source Convention (which includes the Perl conference) was one of O'Reilly's flagship events. Other key events include the Strata Conference on big data, the Velocity Conference on Web Performance and Operations, and FOO Camp. Past events of note include the O'Reilly Emerging Technology Conference and the Web 2.0 Summit. Overall, O'Reilly describes its business not as publishing or conferences, but as "changing the world by spreading the knowledge of innovators."

==== Discontinued conferences ====
- Strata Data Conference
- OSCON (O'Reilly Open Source Convention)
- Velocity Conference
- Artificial Intelligence Conference
- TensorFlow World
- The O'Reilly Software Architecture Conference
- O'Reilly Emerging Technology Conference (2001 as O'Reilly P2P Conference; 2002–2009)
- Fluent
- Tools of Change (TOC) Conference (2007–2013)
- The Next:Economy Summit
- The Next:Money Summit
- The Solid Conference
- The O'Reilly Design Conference
- Web 2.0 Summit (co-produced with TechWeb)
- Web 2.0 Expo (co-produced with TechWeb)
- MySQL Conference and Expo (co-presented by MySQL AB until 2008, then by Sun Microsystems in 2009, and by Oracle Corporation since 2010)
- RailsConf (co-presented by Ruby Central)
- Where 2.0
- Money:Tech
- Gov 2.0 Expo and Gov 2.0 Summit (co-produced with TechWeb)
- O'Reilly school of technology (discontinued as of January 6, 2016)

=== O'Reilly Network ===
In the late 1990s, O'Reilly founded the O'Reilly Network, which grew to include sites such as:

- LinuxDevCenter.com
- MacDevCenter.com
- WindowsDevCenter.com
- ONLamp.com
- O'Reilly Radar

In 2008 the company revised its online model and stopped publishing on several of its sites (including Codezoo and O'Reilly Connection). The company also produced dev2dev (a WebLogic-oriented site) in association with BEA and java.net (an open-source community for Java programmers) in association with Sun Microsystems and CollabNet.

=== O'Reilly Online Learning (formerly Safari Books Online) ===
In 2001, O'Reilly launched Safari Books Online, a subscription-based service providing access to ebooks and videos as a joint venture with the Pearson Technology Group. The platform includes content from O'Reilly and over 200 publishers including Adobe Press, Alpha Books, Cisco Press, FT Press, Microsoft Press, New Riders Publishing, Packt, Peachpit Press, Prentice Hall, Prentice Hall PTR, Que and Sams Publishing.

In 2014, O'Reilly Media acquired Pearson's stake, making Safari Books Online a wholly owned subsidiary of O'Reilly Media. O'Reilly did a redesign of the site and had success in expanding beyond Safari's core B2C market into the B2B Enterprise market.

In 2017, O'Reilly Media announced they were no longer selling books online, including ebooks. Instead, everyone was encouraged to sign up for Safari or purchase books through online retailers such as Amazon.

In 2018, O'Reilly Media rebranded Safari to what is now O'Reilly online learning. The platform includes books, videos, live online training, O'Reilly conference videos, and more. In 2019, O'Reilly acquired Katacoda so users can experiment with code in the website itself.

=== Web 2.0 phrase ===
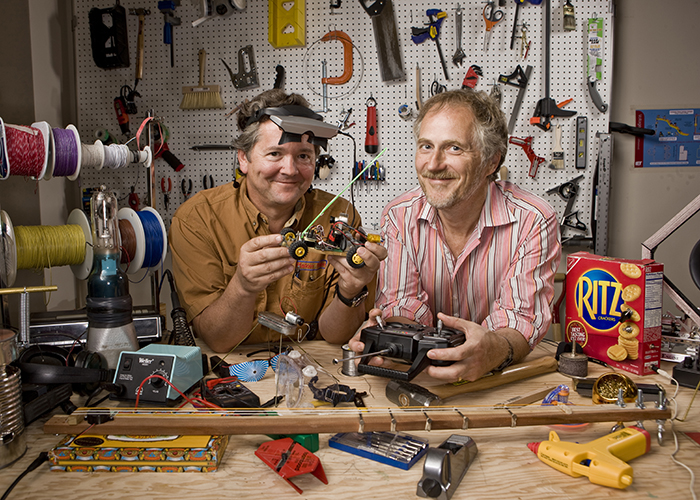
Dale Dougherty, left, and Tim O'Reilly in 2008

In 2003, after the dot com bust, O'Reilly's corporate goal was to reignite enthusiasm in the computer industry. To do this, Dale Dougherty and Tim O'Reilly decided to use the term "Web 2.0" coined in January 1999 by Darcy DiNucci. The term was used for the Web 2.0 Summit run by O'Reilly Media and TechWeb (formerly CMP Media). CMP registered Web 2.0 as a Service Mark "for arranging and conducting live events, namely trade shows, expositions, business conferences and educational conferences in various fields of computers and information technology." Web 2.0 framed what distinguished the companies that survived the dot com bust from those that died, and identified key drivers of future success, including what is now called cloud computing, big data, and new approaches to iterative, data-driven software development.

The tarsier featured on the cover of Learning the vi Editor has been incorporated into the O'Reilly logo.

In May 2006 CMP Media learned of an impending event called the "Web 2.0 Half day conference". Concerned over their obligation to take reasonable means to enforce their trade and service marks, CMP sent a cease and desist letter to the non-profit Irish organizers of the event. This attempt to restrict through legal mechanisms the use of the term was criticized by some. The legal issue was resolved by O'Reilly's apologizing for the early and aggressive involvement of attorneys, rather than simply calling the organizers, and allowing them to use the service mark for this single event.

=== Make: and Craft: ===
In January 2005 the company launched Make: magazine and in 2006 it launched Maker Faire. The flagship Maker Faire in San Mateo, California, drew over 130,000 attendees. Other Faires around the world collectively draw millions. In 2012, O'Reilly Media spun out the Make properties into a separate venture-backed company, Maker Media, headed up by former O'Reilly executive and Make founder Dale Dougherty.

In the fall of 2006, O'Reilly added a second magazine, Craft:, with the tagline "Transforming Traditional Crafts." Craft: folded in 2009.

In the summer of 2019, Maker Media laid off its entire staff and ceased operations.

Make Magazine is currently published by Make Community LLC.

=== Post–Tim O'Reilly era ===
In 2011, Tim O'Reilly stepped down from his day-to-day duties as O'Reilly Media CEO to focus his energy and attention on the Gov 2.0 movement. Since then, the company has been run by Laura Baldwin. Baldwin comes from a finance and consulting background.

=== Infinite Skills acquisition ===
In 2014 O'Reilly acquired Infinite Skills, a Canadian publisher of online and DVD video courses.

== Licensing ==
O'Reilly uses Creative Commons' Founders Copyright, which grants the company exclusive use of content produced by the authors who sign with them for 28 years. Although it is shorter than the current default duration of the monopoly in copyright law, it is still quite restrictive compared with other, widely used, licenses offered by Creative Commons.

== See also ==
- O'Reilly Media books
