= Tim O'Reilly =

Irish-American programmer, author and businessman (born 1954)

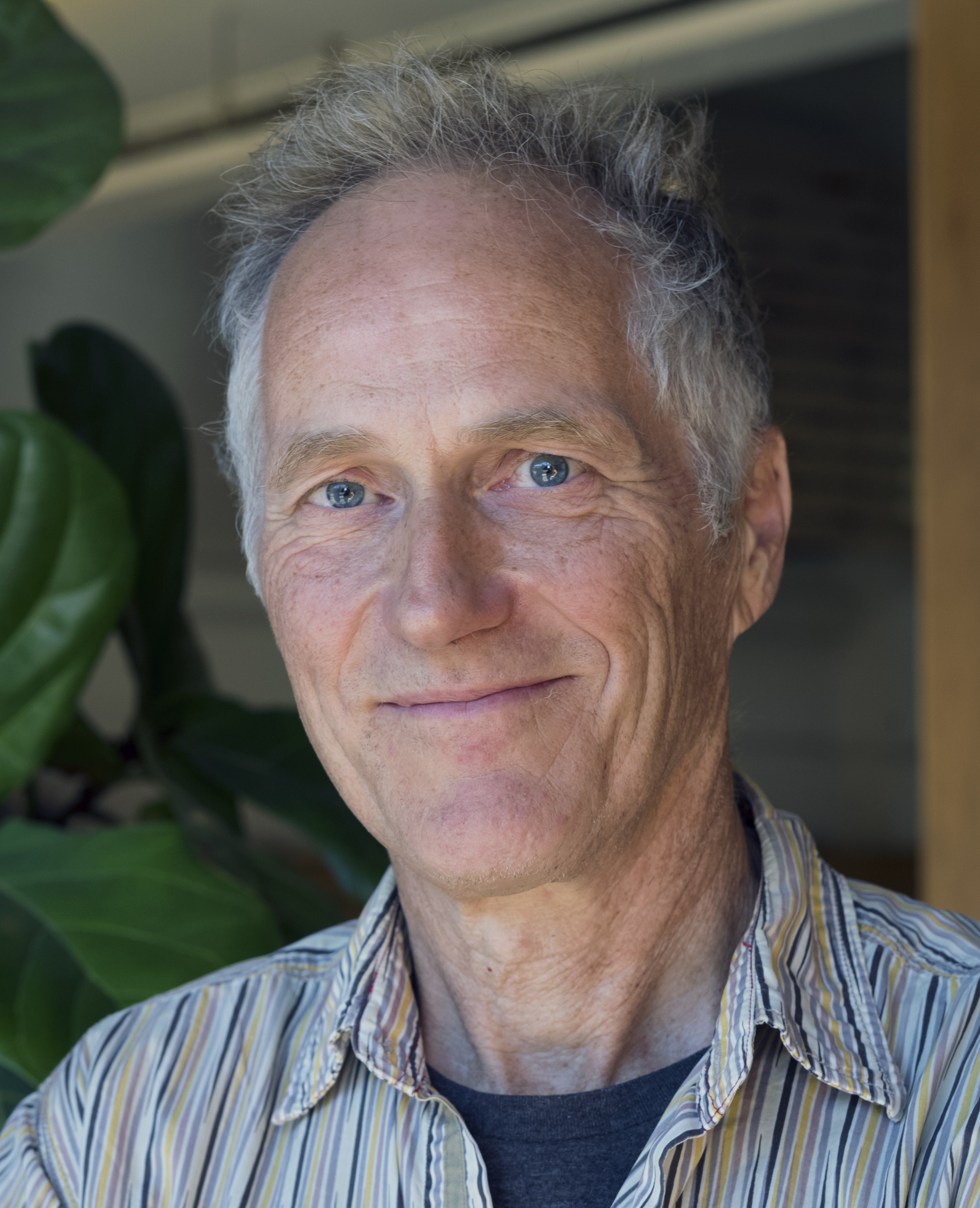
- O'Reilly in 2017
- Born: Timothy O'Reilly; 6 June 1954 (age 72); Cork, Ireland
- Education: Harvard University (AB)
- Employer: O'Reilly Media
- Board member of: Safari Books Online; Maker Media; PeerJ; Macromedia; MySQL AB; Code for America
- Spouses: Christina O'Reilly (m. 1974) Jennifer Pahlka (m. 2015)
- Children: 2
- Website: oreilly.com/tim

Timothy O'Reilly (born 6 June 1954) is an Irish-American author and publisher, who is the founder of O'Reilly Media (formerly O'Reilly & Associates). He popularised the terms open source and Web 2.0.

== Education and early life ==
Born in County Cork, Ireland, Tim O'Reilly moved to San Francisco, California with his family when he was a baby. He has three brothers and three sisters. As a teenager, encouraged by his older brother Sean, O'Reilly became a follower of George Simon, a writer and adherent of the general semantics program. Through Simon, O'Reilly became acquainted with the work of Alfred Korzybski, which he has cited as a formative experience.

In 1973, O'Reilly enrolled at Harvard College to study classics and graduated cum laude with a Bachelor of Arts degree in 1975. During O'Reilly's first year at Harvard, George Simon died in an accident.

== Career ==
After graduating, O'Reilly completed an edition of Simon's Notebooks, 1965–1973. He also wrote a well-received book on the science fiction writer Frank Herbert and edited a collection of Herbert's essays and interviews. O'Reilly got started as a technical writer in 1977. He started publishing computer manuals in 1983, setting up his business in a converted barn in Newton, Massachusetts, where about a dozen employees worked in a single open room. In 1989, O'Reilly moved his company to Sebastopol, California, and published the Whole Internet User's Guide and Catalog, which was a best-seller in 1992. O'Reilly's business, then known as O'Reilly & Associates, steadily grew through the 1990s, during which period it expanded from paper printed materials to web publishing. In 1993, the company's catalogue became an early web portal, the Global Network Navigator, which in 1995 was sold to America Online.

The company suffered in the dot-com crash of 2000. As book sales decreased, O'Reilly laid off about seventy people, approximately a quarter of staff, but thereafter rebuilt the company around ebook publishing and event production. In 2011, Tim O'Reilly gave control of O'Reilly Media to the company's CFO, Laura Baldwin, but kept his longtime title of CEO.

As a venture capitalist, O'Reilly has invested in companies such as Fastly, Blogger, Delicious, Foursquare, Bitly, and Chumby. O'Reilly serves on the board of directors of Safari Books Online, Maker Media, PeerJ, and the nonprofit organization Code for America. He was a board member of Macromedia until its 2005 merger with Adobe Systems, and of MySQL AB until its sale to Sun Microsystems. In February 2012, he joined the UC Berkeley School of Information Advisory Board.

In 2017, O'Reilly published the book WTF? What's the Future and Why It's Up to Us about technology's potential to enhance the human experience.

=== Early causes ===
In 1996, O'Reilly fought against a 10-Connection Limit on TCP/IP NT Workstations, writing a letter to the United States Department of Justice, Bill Gates, and CNN, concerned that the Internet was still in its infancy, and that limitations could cripple the technology before it ever had a chance to reach its full potential. In 2001, O'Reilly was involved in a dispute with Amazon.com, against Amazon's one-click patent and, specifically, Amazon's assertion of that patent against rival Barnes & Noble. The protest ended with O'Reilly and Amazon.com founder Jeff Bezos visiting Washington D.C. to lobby for patent reform.

=== Open source software ===
In 1998, O'Reilly helped rebrand free software under the term open source. O'Reilly sees the role of open source as being inseparable from the development of the Internet, pointing to the widely used TCP/IP protocol, sendmail, Apache, Perl, Linux and other open source platforms. He is concerned about trends towards new forms of lock-in.

=== Web 2.0 ===
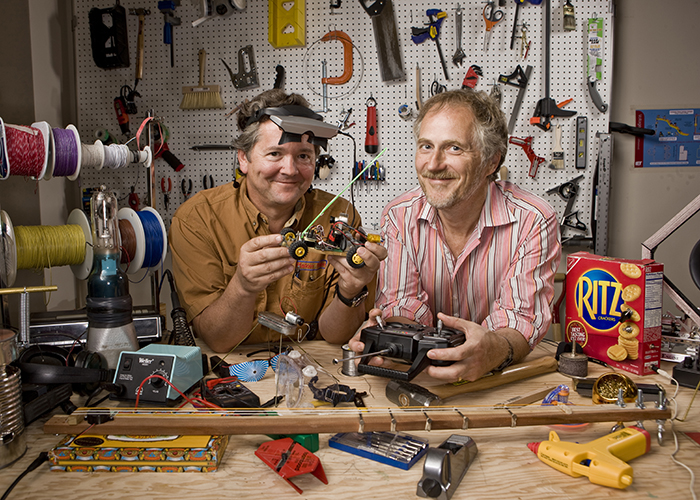
O'Reilly, right, with Dale Dougherty in 2008

In 2003, after the dot-com bust, O'Reilly Media's corporate goal was to reignite enthusiasm in the computer industry. Dale Dougherty, an executive at O'Reilly, invoked the phrase "Web 2.0" during a brainstorming session. Though O'Reilly is often credited with popularizing the phrase Web 2.0, it originated with Darcy DiNucci, who coined the term in 1999. O'Reilly went on to popularize the phrase as a handle for the resurgence of the web after the dotcom crash of 2000, and as a generic term for the "harnessing of collective intelligence" viewed as the hallmark of this resurgence. O'Reilly first called an "executive conference" in 2004, inviting five hundred technology and business leaders, followed by a public version of the event in 2005. Annual iterations of the event, known as the "Web 2.0 Summit" from 2006 onwards, continued until 2011.

O'Reilly and employees of O'Reilly Media have applied the "2.0" concept to conferences in publishing and government, amongst other things. O'Reilly envisions the Internet Operating System as consisting of various sub systems, such as media, payment, speech recognition, location, and identity. He uses the analogy of the biome of the human body having more bacterial than human cells (a ratio lately estimated at 1.3:1), but depending upon millions of other organisms each pursuing their own interest but nevertheless weaving a co-operative web.

=== Government as platform ===
O'Reilly has been propagating the notion of "government as platform", or "Gov 2.0". He is considered the most enthusiastic promoter of algorithmic regulation, the ongoing monitoring and modification of government policies via open data feedback.

=== Inner source ===
In 2001, O'Reilly coined the term inner source for the use of open source software development practices and the establishment of an open source-like culture within organisations whereby the organisation may still develop proprietary software but internally opens up its development.

=== Algorithmic attention rents ===
Originally proposed by Tim O'Reilly, and developed further in collaboration with Ilan Strauss and Mariana Mazzucato, "algorithmic attention rents" entails the use of a platform's algorithms to allocate user attention to content which is more profitable or beneficial to the platform, at the expense of its ecosystem of users and third-party firms, content creators, website developers, etc. Algorithms are used to degrade the quality of information shown to the user, as paid for and addictive content is promoted ahead of "organic" content which best meets users needs.

A detailed case study has been undertaken with respect to Amazon and its ability to degrade search results quality through the inclusion of (duplicated) paid advertising results in its product search results for its third-party marketplace. The theoretical (legal-economic) underpinnings of this is discussed in a companion paper.

== Personal life ==
After graduating from Harvard, O'Reilly married his first wife, Christina, with whom he moved to the Boston area. The couple raised two daughters, Arwen and Meara. Arwen is married to Saul Griffith.

On 11 April 2015 O'Reilly married Jennifer Pahlka, a former Deputy CTO of the US, and founder and former Executive Director of Code for America.

== See also ==
- Algorithmic regulation
- Infoware
- Make
