= Darcy DiNucci =

Author and designer

Darcy DiNucci is an author, web designer, and expert in user experience. DiNucci coined the term Web 2.0 in 1999 and predicted the influence it would have on public relations.

== Career ==
DiNucci has worked in web design and user experience in a number of companies including Ammunition, Method, Adaptive Path, Sequence, and Smart Design.

In 1999, DiNucci introduced the concept of Web 2.0 and anticipated the influence it would likely have on public relations in an article in Print Magazine.

== Works ==
- DiNucci, Darcy (1994), The Macintosh Bible (5th ed.), Peachpit Press, ISBN 978-1-56609-140-4
- DiNucci, Darcy; Giudice, Maria; Stiles, Lynne (1998), Elements of Web Design (2nd ed.), Peachpit Press, ISBN 978-0-201-69698-1
- DiNucci, Darcy (April 1999). "Fragmented Future" (PDF). Print Magazine. 53 (4): 221–222.
- DiNucci, Darcy (2003), Macromedia Flash Interface Design: Twelve Effective Interfaces and Why They Work, Peachpit, ISBN 978-0-321-12399-2
- DiNucci, Darcy (2002), Adobe Master Class, Web Site Redesigns: Makovers from Nine Top Design Teams, Adobe Press, ISBN 978-0-201-75864-1

== See also ==
- History of the Internet
- History of the World Wide Web
- Tim Berners Lee
- Web 2.0 Summit
