= AOLserver =

Open source web server

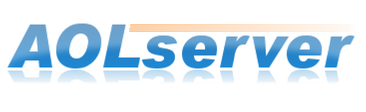
- Original author: NaviSoft
- Developer: AOL
- Stable release: 4.5.1 / 2 February 2009; 17 years ago
- Preview release: 4.5.2 RC0 / 19 September 2012; 14 years ago
- Written in: C, Tcl
- Operating system: Cross-platform
- Type: Web server
- License: AOLserver Public License / MPL / GNU GPL
- Website: aolserver.github.io
- Repository: github.com/AOLserver/AOLserver

AOLserver is AOL's open source web server. AOLserver is multithreaded, Tcl-enabled, and used for large scale, dynamic web sites.

AOLserver is distributed under the Mozilla Public License.

AOLserver was originally developed by NaviSoft under the name "NaviServer", but changed names when AOL bought the company in 1995. Philip Greenspun convinced America Online to open-source the program in 1999.

AOLserver was the first HTTP server program to combine multithreading, a built-in scripting language, and the pooling of persistent database connections. For database-backed Web sites, this enabled performance improvements of 100× compared to the standard practices at the time of CGI scripts that opened fresh database connections on every page load. Eventually other HTTP server programs were able to achieve similar performance with a similar architecture.

AOLserver is a key component in the Open Architecture Community System (OpenACS) which is an advanced open-source toolkit for developing web applications.

In September 2007, a port of AOLserver for the iPhone was made available and later forked under the name "Joggame Server". This fork is described on its SourceForge project page as being a spin-off of AOLserver for devices.

NaviServer (also hosted on SourceForge) is a fork of AOLserver.

== Development history ==
AOLserver 3.0 was released as an open-source web server after AOL open-sourced the program in 1999, following "a few months of frantic code cleanup"; from that point, its development was largely community-driven. Version 3.1 followed in September 2000.

== Performance and adoption ==
AOLserver's multithreaded, connection-pooling architecture gave it a substantial performance advantage over the process-based web servers common at the time, such as Apache 1.3.x, which had to spawn a new process for every incoming request. AOLserver was reported to serve up to 30,000 hits per second on AOL's own sites.

The web development company ArsDigita used AOLserver to build a number of high-traffic websites, including photo.net, which was also used by author and AOLserver advocate Philip Greenspun as a platform for his online tutorials and books on database-backed web development, such as Database Backed Web Sites and SQL for Web Nerds.

== See also ==
- Comparison of web server software
- OpenACS
