= Birkenhead Library =

Public library in New Zealand

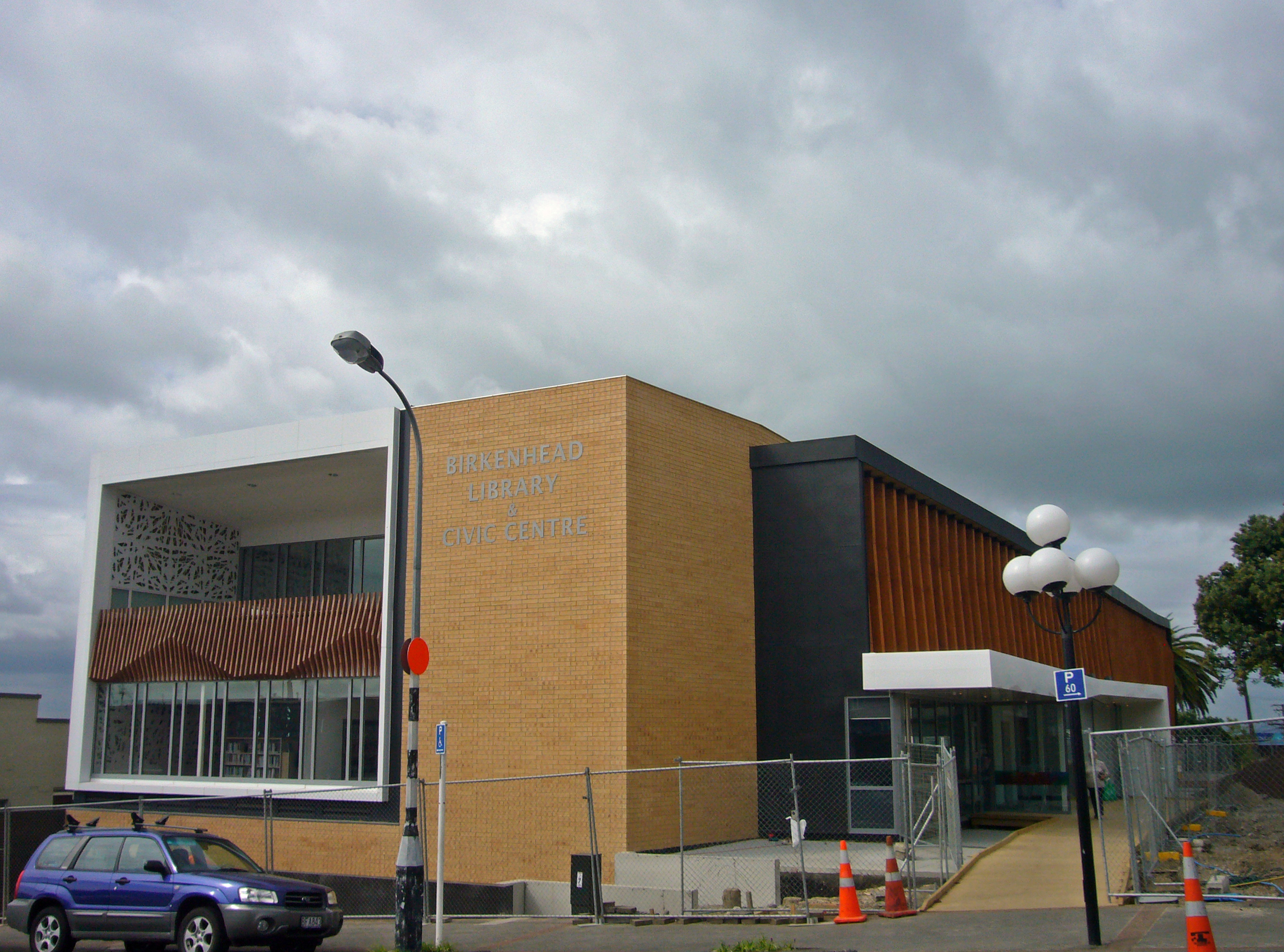
- Birkenhead Library and Civic Centre
- 36°48′56.59″S 174°43′36.09″E
- Location: Corner Rawene Road & Hinemoa Street, Birkenhead, North Shore, Auckland, New Zealand
- Type: Public library
- Established: 1949; 77 years ago
- Branch of: Auckland Libraries

Collection
- Size: 300,000+

Access and use
- Population served: 26,000

Birkenhead Library, part of the Auckland Libraries system, is located on Auckland's North Shore in New Zealand. Founded in 1949 it predominantly serves the areas of Birkenhead, Beach Haven, Birkdale, Kauri Park, Chelsea, and Birkenhead East, a population of about 26,000, including six primary schools, two intermediate schools, and two colleges.

Typical of medium-sized public libraries in New Zealand, it provides an extensive range of modern library resources and services through its integration into a wider urban network, and through its association with the National Library, while retaining its own distinct, local connections such as the Archives Collection of the Chelsea Sugar Refinery.

The library was the first public library to be founded in North Shore City, the first to offer dial-up access to the New Zealand Bibliographic Network, and a leading proponent of full weekend services.

For four years the library was located in temporary quarters in the Birkenhead Leisure Centre, while a dispute over the location and design of its proposed new building was resolved. On 17 December 2009, a new Birkenhead Library and Civic Centre was opened on the site of the former library.

== History ==
The history of Birkenhead Public Library is characterised by four transformations which occurred at approximately twenty-year intervals since its founding in 1949. Three of these transformations involved new buildings, while the other involved amalgamation into the wider North Shore Libraries system. There was also an unexpectedly long interim period when the library was based at the Leisure Centre.

=== Founding of the library ===
At the turn of the twentieth century, apart from "subscription libraries" the only library in Birkenhead was run by the Zion Hill Methodist Church. In 1901, the Birkenhead Borough Council resolved that its legal and finance committee should consider building a public one, but little eventuated. A subsidy of £100 was sought from the government in 1904 for a building "not to exceed a total of £600".

However, it was not until 1949 that the Free Birkenhead Public Library was established. Opening on 14 November, it was located in the basement of the Council Chambers. It was a modest beginning, bolstered by support from the National Library. There was an initial budget of £500 (about $35,984 in 1st Quarter of 2017). The library began with a collection of around 1500 items, "swelled by about another twenty books a month."

=== The "Civic Reserve library" ===
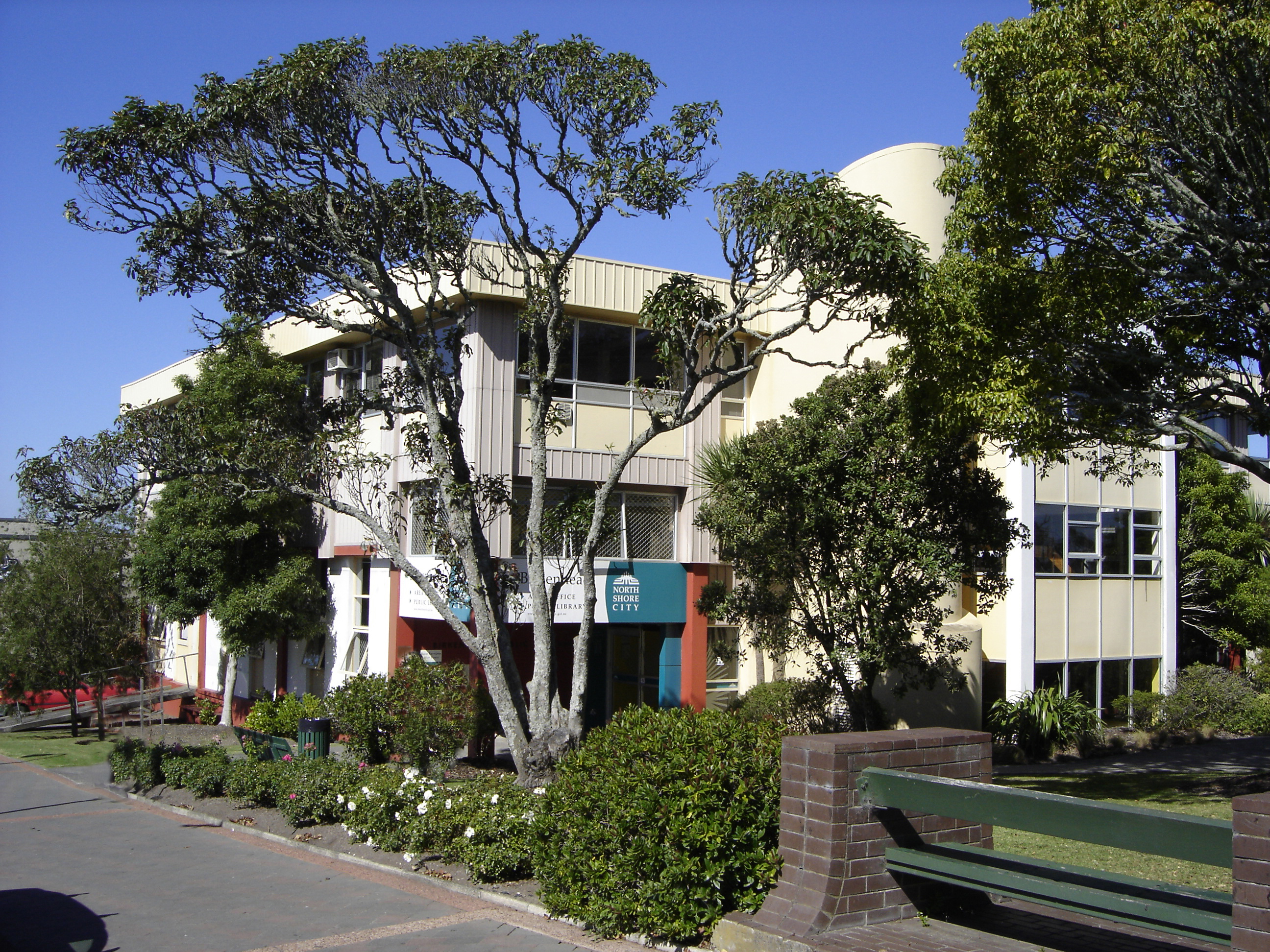
Front entrance of the former library before it was demolished in 2005. The library was on the ground floor, with a mezzanine balcony along one side.

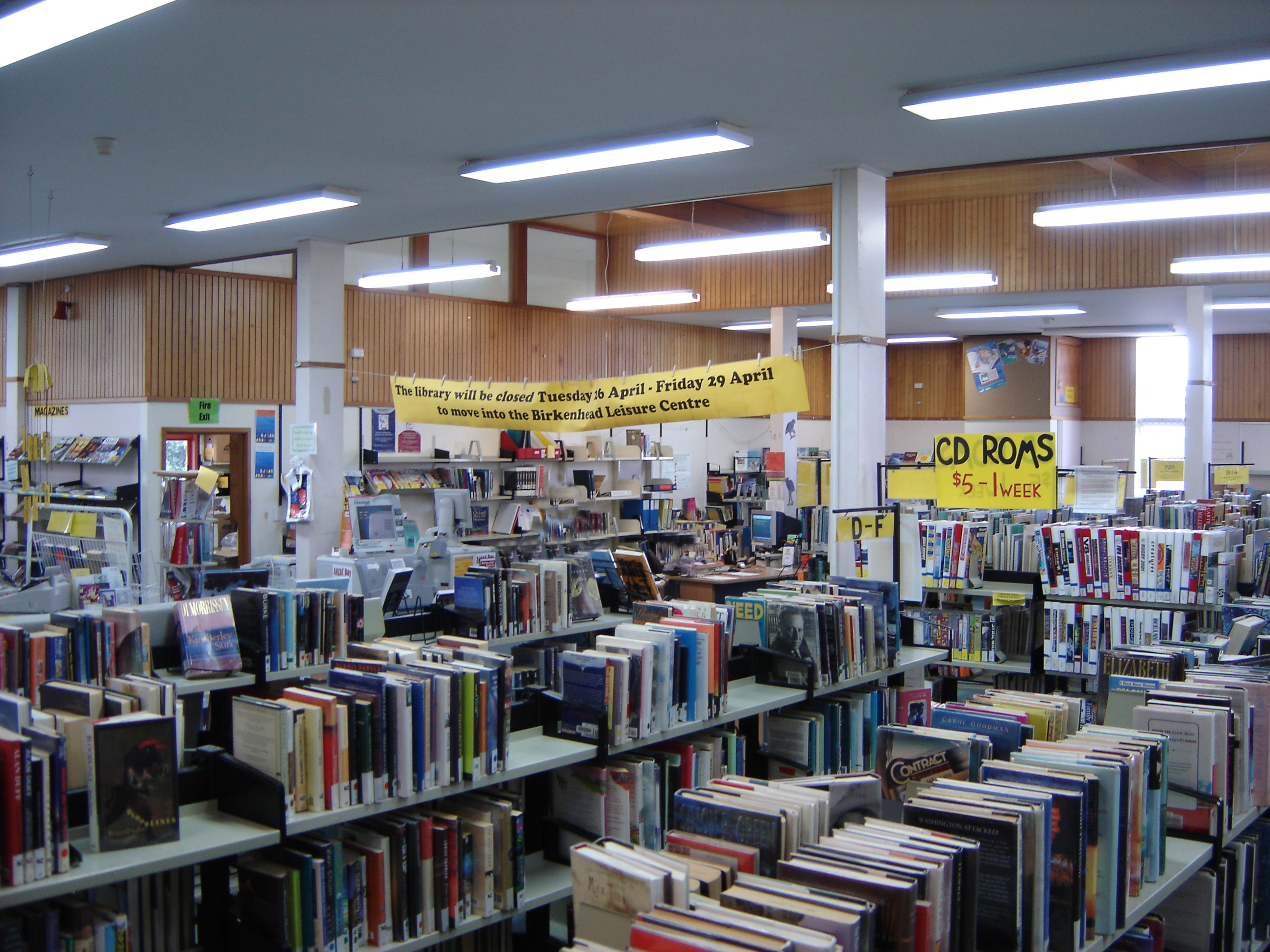
Interior of the former library, circa 2005, showing about a third of the collection.

After the Auckland Harbour Bridge was opened in 1959 the Birkenhead area became much more accessible. By the mid-1960s issues each year had increased dramatically by nearly a hundred thousand items.

Nora Bourke, the chairman of the Library Committee, felt the existing building was limited and, with mayor Cyril Crocombe, began making plans for a much larger building. This was to be built on the Civic Reserve, on which a World War One memorial has stood since 1927.

On 20 April 1968, the new building was officially opened by the Governor General Arthur Porritt. For the next 37 years, until 2005, this was the location of the Birkenhead Public Library, and in 1979 the reserve was renamed Nell Fisher Reserve after the first librarian, Eleanor "Nell" Fisher.

=== Amalgamation ===
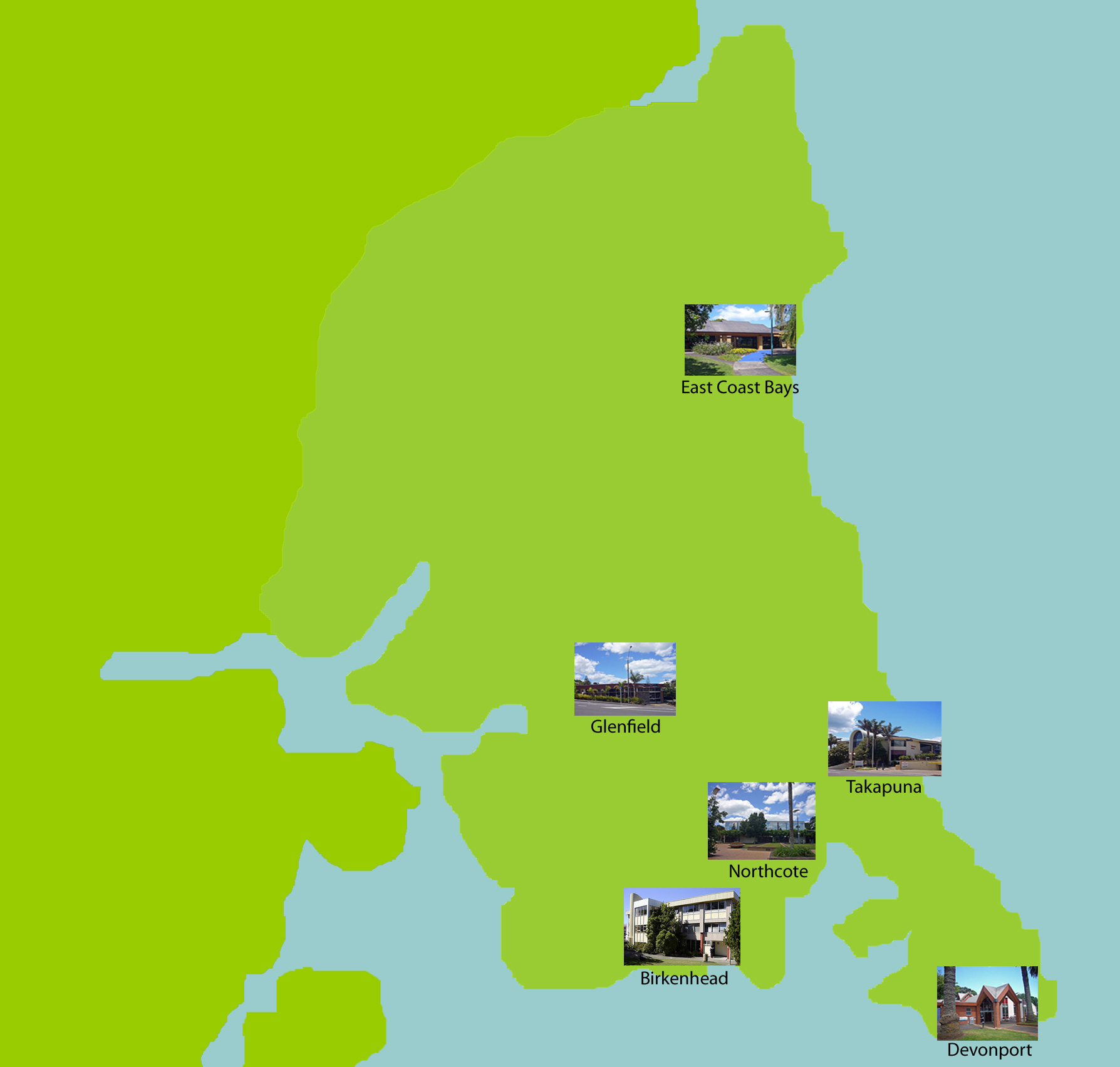
North Shore Libraries at amalgamation.

The 1980s saw an increase in the depth and variety of services offered. A Bedford van was used to start a mobile library service in 1982, and the library began opening on Saturdays in 1983. In 1986, children's multimedia items were offered for the first time, and the New Zealand Bibliographic Network link was established. Soon after, compact discs were made available, while in 1987 the library began opening on Sundays. So service was now provided over the entire week, a first in New Zealand.

Notable too in the late eighties, was the processing of books to create "machine readable codes," which saw the catalogue shifted from card to microfiche. Borrowers were now directly registered onto the computer, and a new computer management system went live, "the most sophisticated...in the world." This was a forerunner of the greater computerisation ahead, including the introduction of self-issue machines in 1995 (pictured), internet access in 1996 and a widening range of electronic resources from 2002.

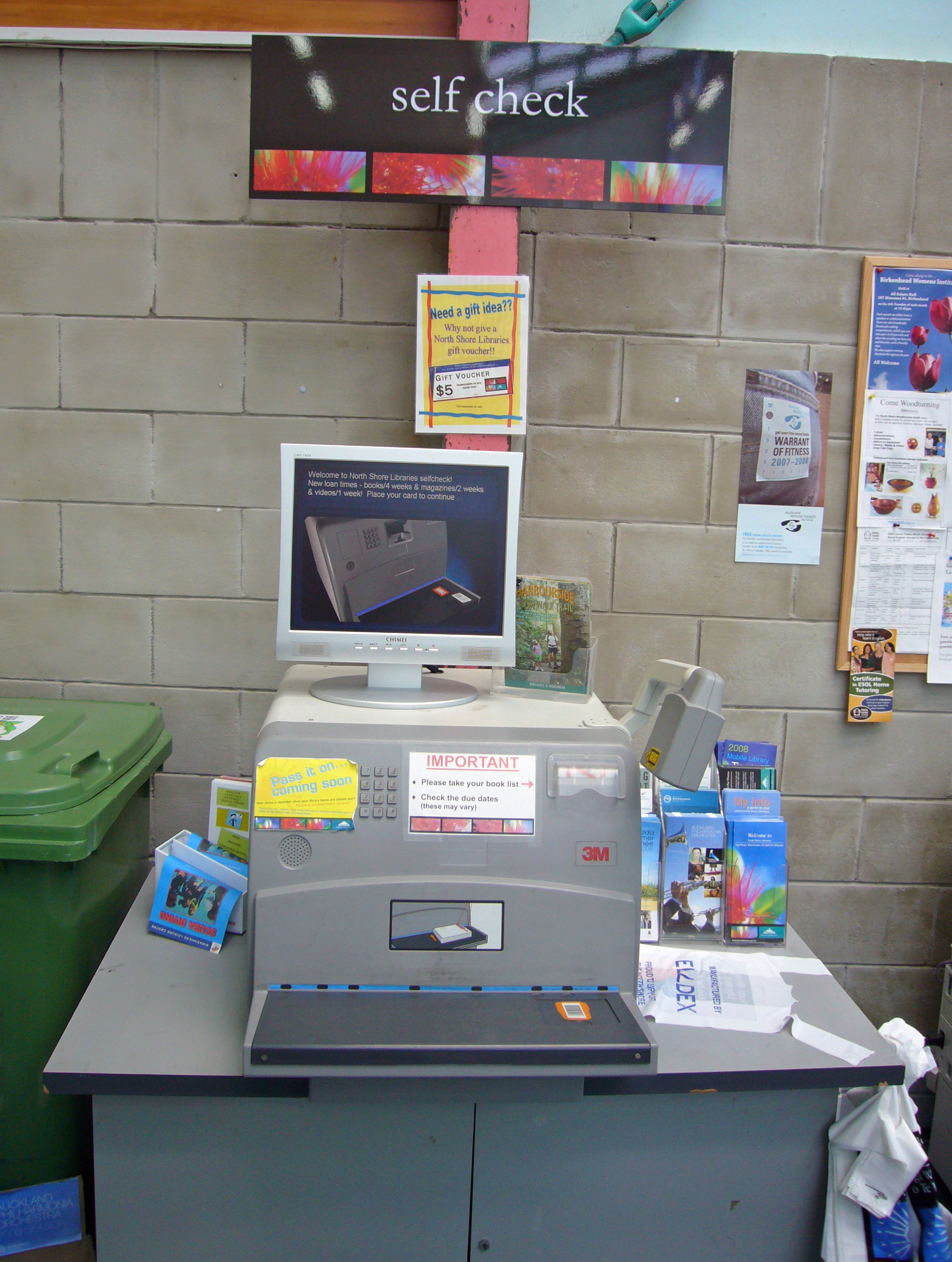
Welcome to the self-issue machine. First introduced to Birkenhead Library in 1995, this is a later version.

However, perhaps the most significant event of the eighties was amalgamation of the Birkenhead and Northcote Boroughs, and the subsequent merging of the local libraries into the North Shore Libraries system in 1989 (pictured). Staff were redeployed and regional development was initiated. A new division, Technical Services, became fully operational at Takapuna. A Children's Services Coordinator was appointed, and the computer management system established the year before was improved to allow universal access to the six libraries' holdings.

This convergence has continued to this day with the advent of the "eLGAR" conglomerate, the Libraries of the Greater Auckland Region. Birkenhead Library (as part of the North Shore Libraries system) began a public rollout of the eLGAR Smarter System on 16 June 2005.

On 1 May 2000, a time capsule was buried out in front of the library, by the Birkenhead war memorial. It contained various items such as maps, driver's licences, shopping receipts, and old library cards from the 1960s and 1970s. Blessed by a kaumatua from Awataha Marae it was planned to be dug up in one hundred years. On the plaque are quoted the opening two lines from T. S. Eliot's poem Burnt Norton.

=== The "Leisure Centre library" ===
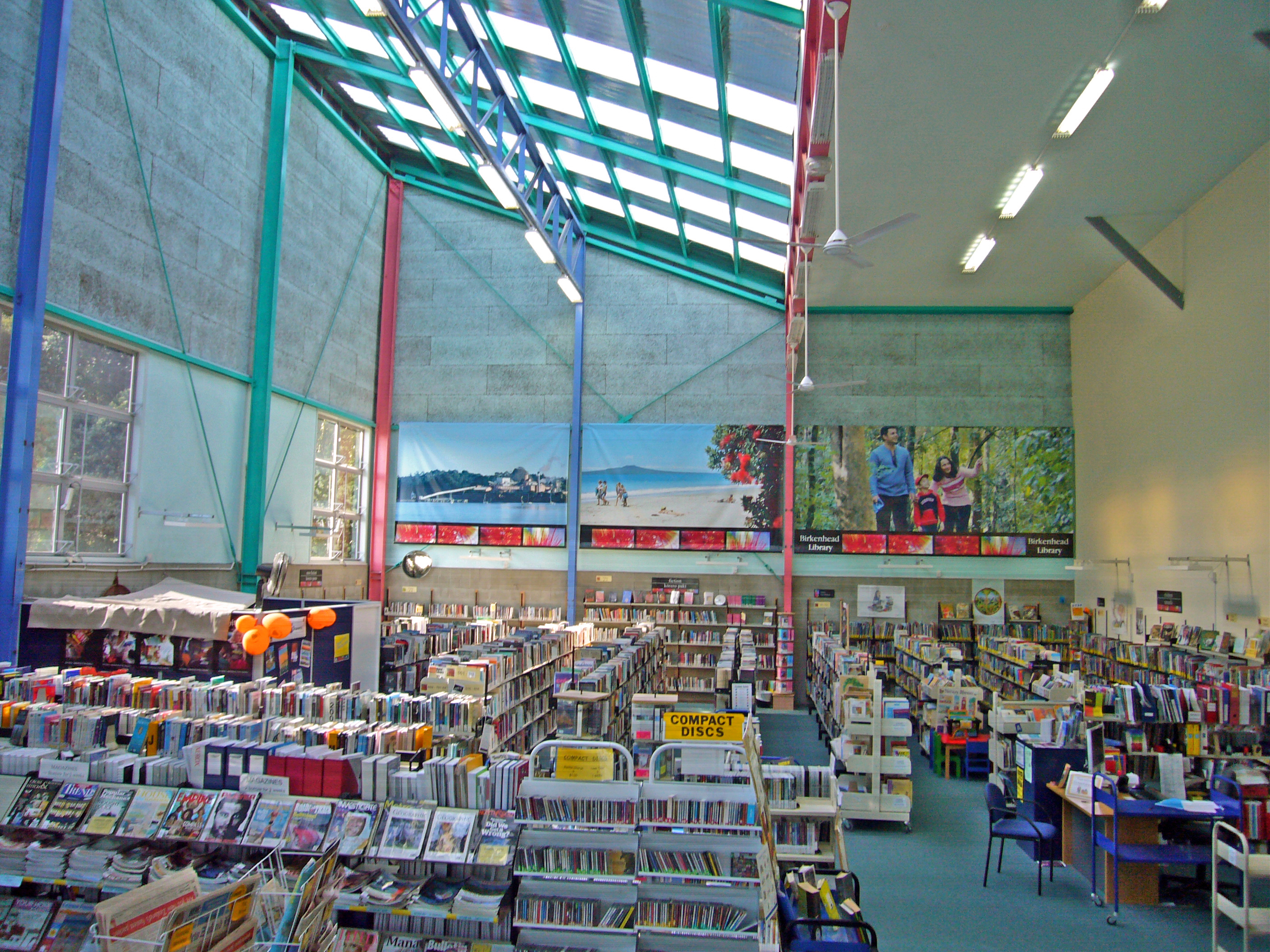
Library in Leisure Centre, facing south.

In 1992 issues topped 300,000 items. By 2003 usage of the library had increased still further, to such an extent that it was noticeably affecting service delivery. Over 500 people a day were entering the library and new members were growing at a rate of 150 per month. Finding room to add new material to the existing stock of some 67,500 items was becoming increasingly difficult.

Another factor driving the need for change was the absence of enough space for community groups, such as primary schools and students, book clubs, and author events. By the end of the 1990s some sort of addition to the library or a rebuild was being actively considered.

In 2005, in preparation for building works on the same site, the library was shifted to a converted basketball court in the Birkenhead Leisure Centre in Mahara Avenue (pictured). Other alternative sites had been considered, but most were found to be either inappropriate or too expensive. With limited space available for services, the Plunket, Citizen's Advice Bureau (CAB), and council Area Office had to find alternative premises. In fact only 50% to 60% of the library's own stock could be accommodated.

$175,000 was budgeted for the fitout of the basketball court, and included such things as improved lighting, car park access, and funding for a passenger lift to allow for disabled patrons. Since the location was some distance from the town centre, a free shuttle bus was provided from Highbury once a week.

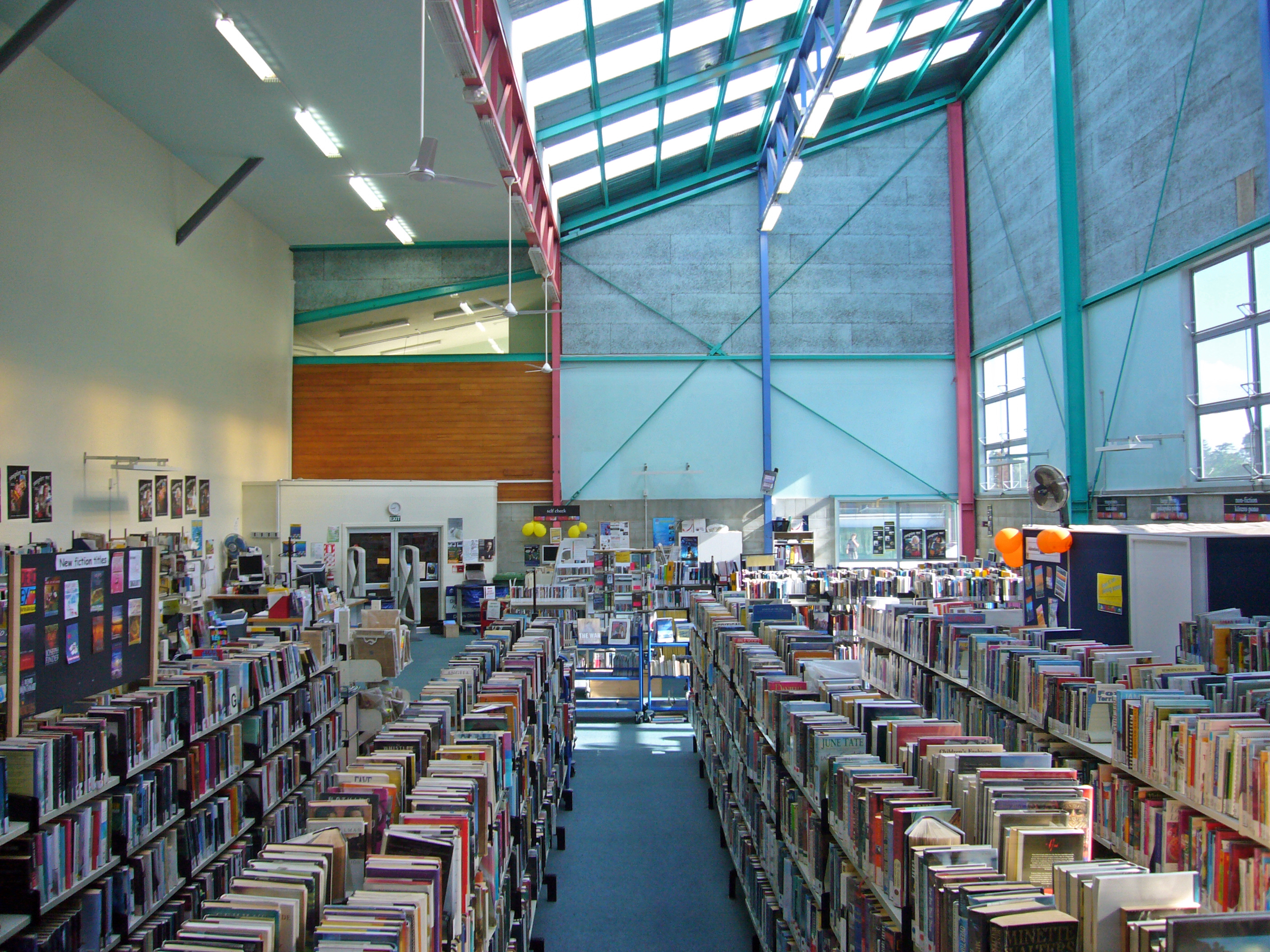
Library in Leisure Centre, facing north.

The Leisure Centre is located in the Birkenhead War Memorial Park. In the areas adjacent to the library, there were problems associated with youth drinking, graffiti, and other undesirable behaviour. Patronage of the library dropped by 35%.

In March 2007, the library was granted a resource consent to use the Leisure Centre location for a further three years or until the new library was built, whichever came later.

This location was meant to be a transitional arrangement while the new building was being constructed. However, the library remained at this temporary location for four years.

=== The current library ===
One of several Council signs around the Nell Fisher reserve. Note also, the artist's impression of the first version of the new library.

Brendan Rawson, from the Architecture Office in Ponsonby, was retained in 2004 to design a building that would create the much needed public space; and in addition, reflect the heritage of the area. Initial concepts took advantage of the considerable potential for views, and incorporated extensive additional landscaping, from more trees to poppies. The first completed design, (pictured), evoked the kauri that were once endemic to the region. Shadow-patterns of branches etched on the windows were reminiscent of the trees in the reserve, one of which was itself a kauri, planted in 1987 to commemorate environmentalist Bill Fisher. There was also to be a café on the second floor and a drive-thru at basement level for dropping off returns. This version was planned to be two metres higher than the previous building, with 1200 m^{2} of floorspace set aside for the library.

Put out to public scrutiny there was some negative feedback. Peter White, a local resident, was critical of the design, calling the building "strange...full of different angles." Community board member Tony Holman wanted more thought put into the heritage aspects, though he did not specify any details. The Friends of the Library, on the other hand, were unanimous in their praise.

Another important aspect of the design was that it would also be a sustainable building. This commitment to the environment was an increasingly significant part of North Shore City Council's approach to urban development, especially through the Resource Management Act and the Treaty of Waitangi. The council aimed to lead by example with best practices. The library design incorporated several notable features, including the maximisation of natural light, the use of recyclable material, including reuse of grey water, and a natural ventilation and cooling system to limit energy costs.

After the Environment Court decision (see below) this design underwent some modification, but the library opened on 17 December 2009 with a formal opening ceremony in February 2010.

== Controversy over the new building ==
In preparation for a new community library complex the old Birkenhead Library was demolished in May 2005. The library service was temporarily relocated to a basketball court in the Birkenhead Leisure Centre. It was expected to be there for eighteen months. However, the project was then delayed for several years; and was not completed until December 2009.

=== Cost of delays ===
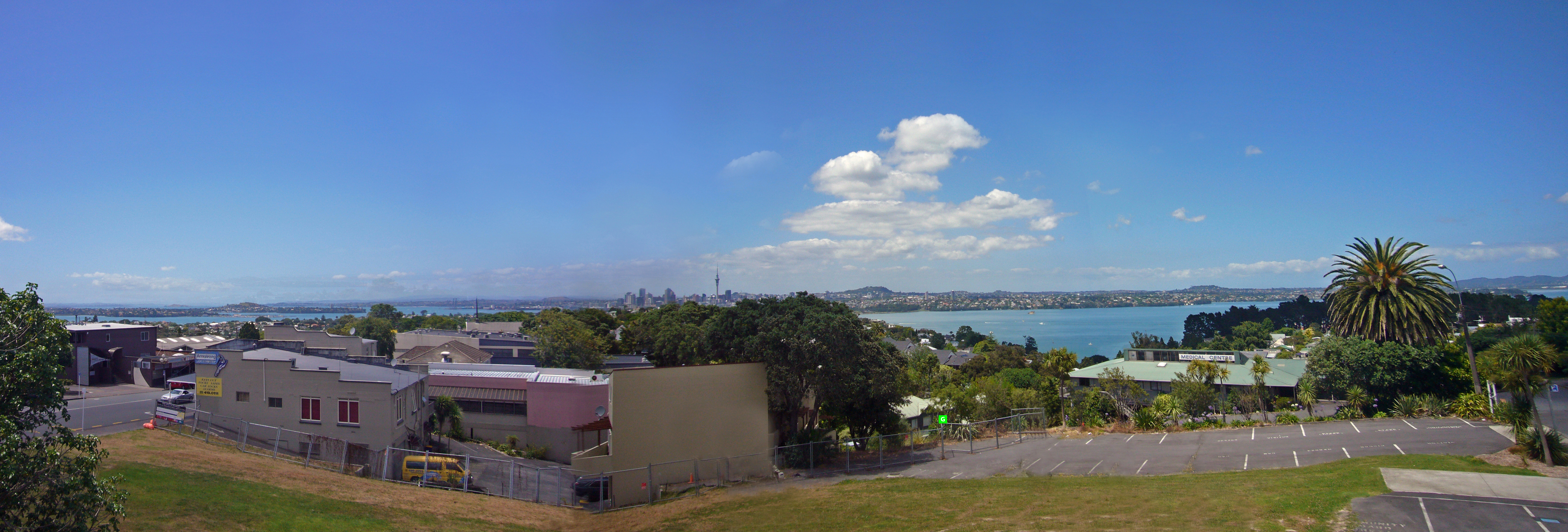
View from Birkenhead Library site. The library building is sited further forward, approximately on the brown patch of mown grass. Proposed levels would have given public access to even more expansive views encompassing the Hauraki Gulf, Sky Tower, and Mt Eden, etc.

The initial focus of the library project was on upgrading the existing building. When the second floor was built on top of the library in the early 1970s, it initially housed the Council Area Office, though it was conceived even then that it would eventually be used as library space. However, investigations in 1999 by engineers revealed that the second-level floor was too weak to support the weight of books without significant strengthening, which would be expensive to undertake. As well, the existing building was showing increasing signs of deterioration, most significantly a leaking ceiling. While it could be repaired, long-term maintenance would negate the short-term cost advantage of doing so. Thus, the option of a completely new building was brought under consideration.

In 2000, a feasibility study considered four options: demolition, refurbishment, ground floor extensions, or extensions to both levels. Demolition and reconstruction was estimated at $3.3 million, cheaper than extending both floors at $3.7m, though nearly twice the cost of refurbishment. The study noted that the site comprised five lots whose exact boundaries were unclear. It also acknowledged the demolition and reconstruction option would require a land use consent application, as the new building would exceed height and coverage restrictions.

In March 2002, City Librarian Geoff Chamberlain presented the study in a report to the council, with the first option being the preferred choice by the library services. It would increase the size of the building to 1600 m^{2}, 1200 m^{2} of which would be devoted to the library itself, with the additional space being used for the Council Area Office and the Citizens Advice Bureau.

A year later, in June 2003, demolition and reconstruction was the confirmed preference. Costs were projected for the next year's draft annual plan. This included $100,000 in the first year for design and planning, $900,000 in the next, and $4.5 million for the building itself. By mid–2004, the concept had been finalised, and the detailed design was being worked on for presentation to the community boards and for public consultation.

On 23 February 2005, public submissions closed and a fitout of the temporary site in the Leisure Centre was begun. Total cost for the new library was now expected to be $6.5 million, then $7.3 million. The project was then delayed, requiring a change to the district plan (see below). In late 2005, the Council Community Services General Manager, Loretta Burnett, stated: "There will be additional costs associated with a plan change but they are modest in comparison." However, subsequent further delays lifted the cost to the region of $9.25 to $9.5 million as of the end of 2007, with a budget shortfall of $2.75 million.

=== Resource consent issue ===
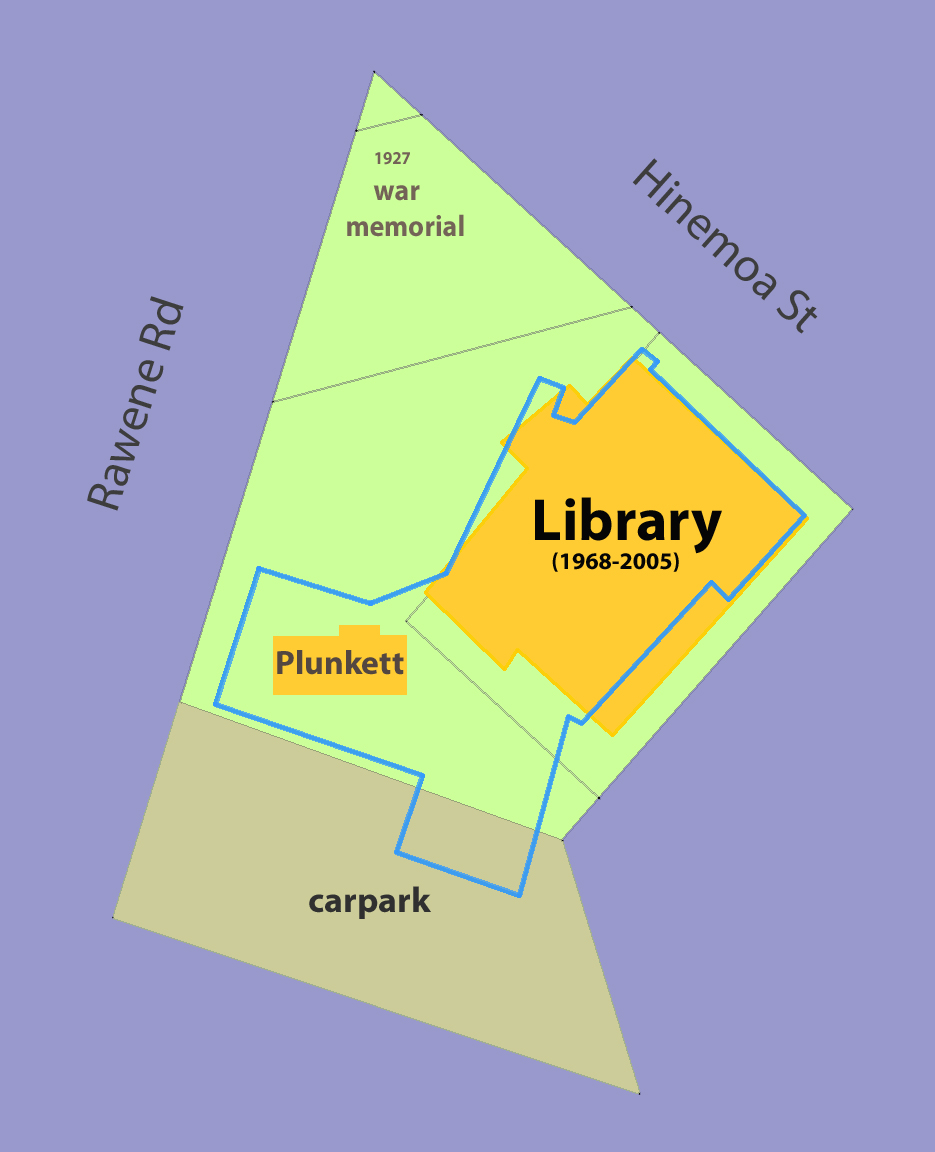
Footprint of the first version of the new library (blue line), in comparison to the old library and Plunket Society building.

The North Shore City Council had lodged a resource consent application for the new building in December 2004, but did not wait for it to be confirmed before demolishing the existing building in May–June the next year. According to a 2006 examination of the project management, Council assumed there was little risk of the application being declined. However, an amended Council report by planner Ian Jefferis revealed that the building was to occupy 15% more of the reserve than expected (pictured). Speaking after his appeal in 2007, Bill Abrahams, owner of Rawene Chambers located opposite the library site (pictured below), said that this lack of a consent was "the crux of the matter."

Some residents claimed they had not been properly consulted. Abrahams felt he should've been consulted because the design blocked his views. The Council disputed that there had been no consultation. The Strategic projects manager, Simon Guillemin, pointed out that there had been a number of public meetings and press releases. He also said there had also been consultation with the Birkenhead Town Centre Association and the Friends of the Library.

Yet in June, independent commissioners declined resource consent. Reasons cited included concern about the impact on the existing environment, traffic flow, and the building's proposed size, which violated the zoning requirements.

=== Rezoning debate ===
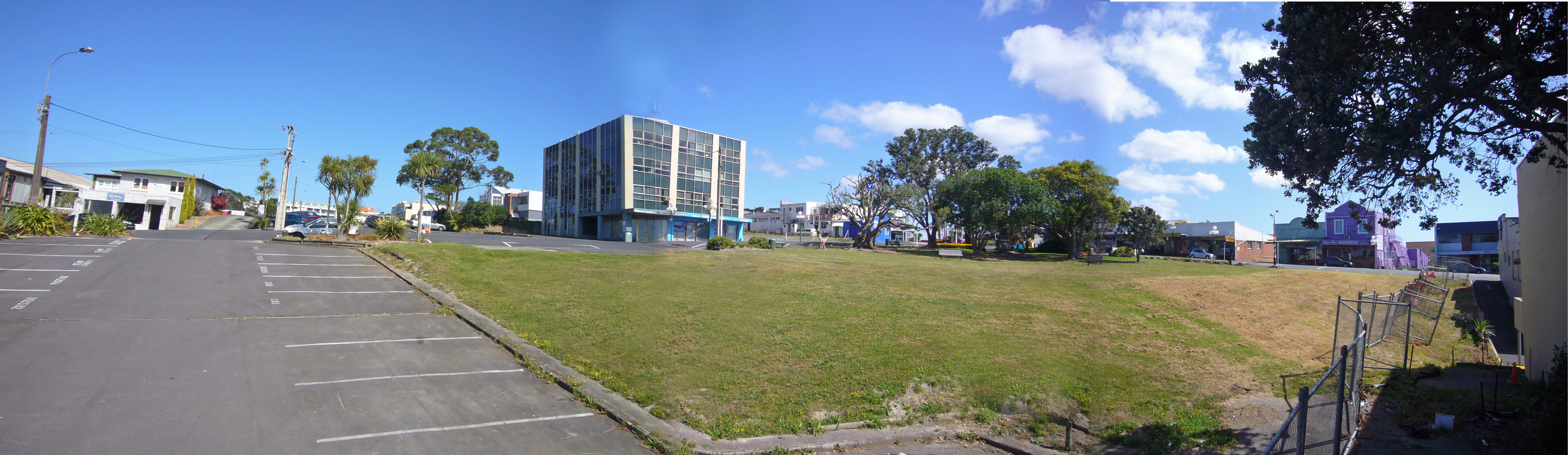
Green space. When the library was demolished some locals came to prefer the opened out area. Note too the position of Rawene Chambers at back.

Thwarted, the Council elected to seek rezoning. As Geoff Chamberlain, the City Librarian acknowledged, the original zoning on the site was historically complex, and never tidied up. In fact, it limited the coverage of any building to only 10% of the land; but the original building built in 1968 had covered 19.5%. This did not include the Plunket building. The new plan was initially thought to be 32.9%, then revised to 48%. This apparent expansion of the footprint particularly concerned resident Clyde Scott, who was later one of those who lodged an appeal with the Environment Court.

In the local paper, the North Shore Times, there was a steady clamour from both opponents of the project and those in favour. In addition to issues with the new library itself, the council's performance was questioned, concern was raised about the drop-off in existing library services, and the library project was linked to the ongoing redevelopment in the whole of the Birkenhead town centre.

Four months after the library was demolished, Jill Nerheny, the Birkenhead-Northcote Community Coordinator, claimed there was a groundswell of support for leaving the land as green space. Residents Clyde Scott and Peter White became adamant the community would be better served with a park on the reserve site and the library located elsewhere in Highbury. Others lobbied for the fence ringing the library site to be taken down, and eventually the Birkenhead-Northcote Community Board had it pushed back to the perimeter. Two new park benches were installed on the reserve to take advantage of the expanse that was now available (pictured).

As part of their later application on rezoning, the Council submitted a report on the prevailing winds, which suggested the land would be unsuitable as open space. While the commissioners acknowledged this, they felt that landscaping could improve the situation somewhat. They then noted the number of people using the newly opened reserve was "relatively modest," especially when contrasted with the significant number who wanted to reinstate the library there.

Three-quarters of those who made submissions on the rezoning supported the change, including Thea Muldoon. Prominent among those objecting were former television newsreader Judy Bailey, and property developer, Graham Milne.

Milne, who had made proposals as far back as 1989, proffered a wide variety of alternative plans for a far more elaborate community centre. These involved road closures, adding new roads, and leasing or selling his land on 15 and 17 Rawene Road, or going into partnership using his buildings. There was, however, little support for his ideas. In October 2005, he sent an email to Community Services & Parks Committee claiming his proposals had been misrepresented. He accused those doing the assessment reports of "yet more incompetence" and threatened to contest the rezoning "fiercely.. every step of the way." The Committee concluded, contrary to Milne, that the reports were "thorough and included site analysis, as well as evaluation of alternatives."

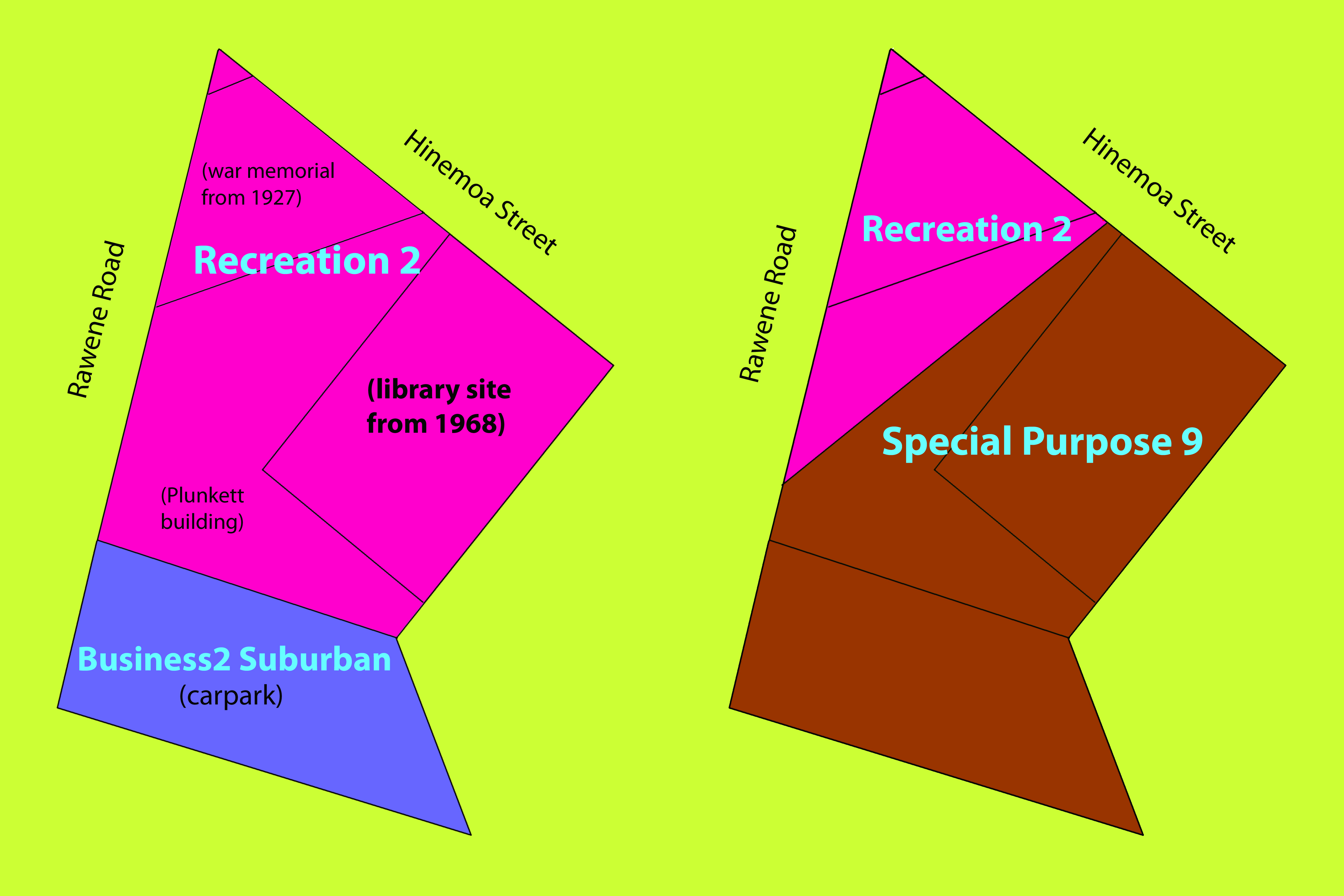
Zoning at the library site, before and after the commissioners' decision.

In June 2006, the three independent commissioners approved the rezoning of the district plan (pictured). Their decision acknowledged the significance of historical precedent. In other words, the fact that there had been a library on the site for over thirty years was "notable" with regards to the usage the land was now put to. Also important was the appropriateness of the site in comparison to other options. Previous reports in 2003 and 2005 had considered the existing site was the best choice, while the Highbury Centre Plan of 2006 indicated that there had been extensive close consultation with the community over two years, which in a general sense was pertinent to the usage of the contested land. The commissioners concurred, and the library site became formalised as part of a Special Purpose 9 zone, which allows for the continued operation of community facilities. They noted too, that it is this zoning which underlies other North Shore Libraries, such as the ones at Takapuna and Glenfield.

The commissioners also reconfigured the Recreation 2 boundary, to cut through the middle plot. This was done to safeguard the treed area, and to ensure a better balance between the reserve and the building complex. They emphasised the need for integration, both physical and visual, between the two zones to encourage usage of the recreation area.

=== Environment court ===
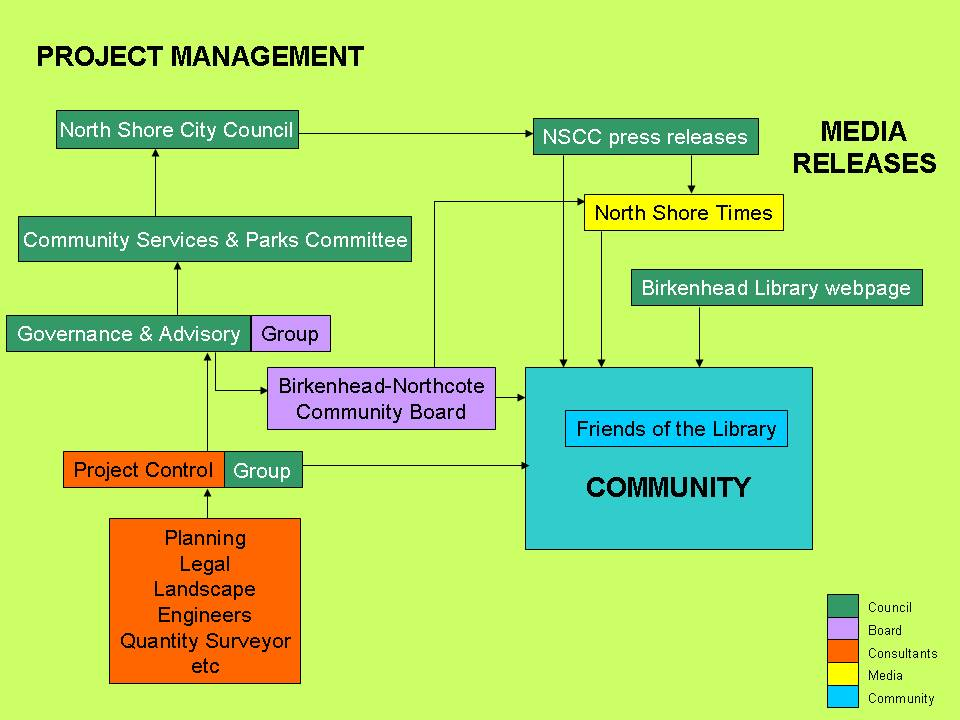
Project management structure for the new library building, incorporating the Governance and Advisory group.

It was expected then that the library project would be further delayed by two years. While the exact future of the library was uncertain, a survey conducted by the MP for Northcote Jonathan Coleman in October 2006 showed there was widespread public support for its return to its former site.

However, Abraham Holdings, owner of Rawene Chambers, located opposite the library's former site, lodged a last-minute appeal with the Environment Court, claiming, among other things, concern over the impact on the historic value of the reserve. Former councillor Jenny Kirk decried Abraham Holdings for their blatant commercial self-interest, and lodged a counter objection. A hearing was set for 28 May 2007.

Speaking on behalf of the rezoning were Council, Friends of the Library (represented by Mrs. Adrienne Wright), Plunket (by Ms. Jane Sheridan and Jenny Kirk); speaking against were Abraham Holdings, Graham Milne (Airborne Asia Pacific), Clyde Scott, Peter White and David Brook.

After three months' deliberation the Environment Court approved the building of a new library on the former site, but reaffirmed the rezoning commissioners' restrictions, notably the restriction on height which dropped the maximum from 11 m to 9 m, and the constraints on the footprint. The Council agreed, "keen to keep the planning process as straight-forward as possible." Bill Abraham, of Abraham Holdings, claimed "people in years to come will be grateful for all the park space that has been kept." Indications were that it would still be larger than the old library, with 250 m^{2} of extra floorspace, though this would make it some 200 m^{2} to 300 m^{2} smaller than the original preferred design.

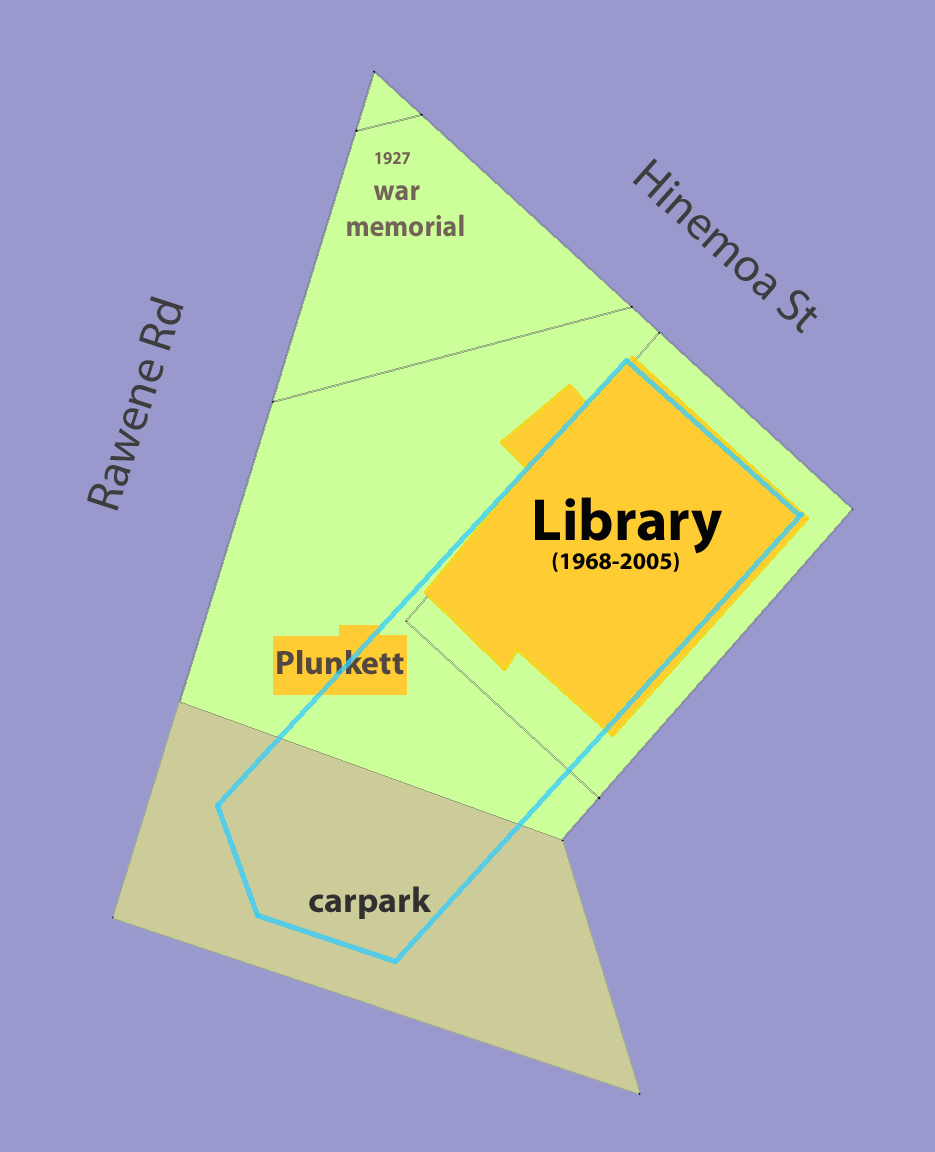
Footprint of version two of the new library (blue line) agreed to after the Environment Court case.

The steering group was redesignated as the Governance and Advisory Group. Consisting of councillors, community board members, and the Community Services general manager, it was set up to monitor the project more closely.

Construction began in June 2007, and the new $9 million building opened on 17 December 2009.

== Staff structure ==
In the beginning volunteers were crucial to the running of the library. Savings in wages were considered instrumental in allowing the purchase of more books and also allowed money to be set aside for future planned extensions to the building. In 1949 the number of volunteers was recorded at twenty-eight. They included the town clerk and a councillor, Percy Hurn, as well others who had given freely of their expertise such as Duthie from the Auckland Public library, a passing instructor from the Country Library service, and those pulled in to read to the youngsters during the school holidays. Among this "band of honorary assistants" a Mrs. Gaidener, Mr. Slovey and Mr. Odd came in for particular acknowledgement. At the opening of the new library building nearly twenty years later the mayor paid tribute to all the original volunteers.

By 1950 the Borough Council was looking to formally employ someone for £100 a year. Joan Foggin and John Wilson were the first paid staff, while Eleanor Fisher, already working in the library became the first full-time staff member in 1952. She remained the in-charge librarian until her retirement nineteen years later. By 1955 there was a part-time library assistant as well; and soon a fulltime junior was being considered. Growth in library use and opening hours continued, so that by 1968 there were 3 full-timers and a part-timer to help on Friday nights. Staffing peaked in 1986 with 11.5 full time equivalents, and was subsequently reduced to 8.67. This includes staff spread over seven days, and reflects the high preponderance of part-timers typical of the industry. The decrease in staff occurred despite the onset of Sunday openings and the increase in door-count and issues because, at least in part, amalgamation allowed the centralisation of many departments, such as cataloguing. The onset of computers has also increased efficiency, even to the near complete automation of some services, such as circulation through self-issue machines, which recorded 40% of items borrowed within their first months of installation at Birkenhead in 1995.

The current staff structure is headed by a Community Librarian, with two main senior positions: an Information Services Librarian and a Children and Young Adults Librarian, both of which are full-time positions. Other senior roles include the Weekend Supervisors. The main bulk of staff continues to be Library Assistants, with 1–2 being fulltime. There are also a number of shelvers, generally students. Other occasional staff have included a librarian on exchange from England, and various volunteers, such as a Taskforce Green worker helping with a rebarcoding project, and a student doing a Duke of Edinburgh award.

== Services ==
Services include children's programmes, reference, interloans, internet access, printer-copier, and housebound deliveries.

=== Children's programmes ===
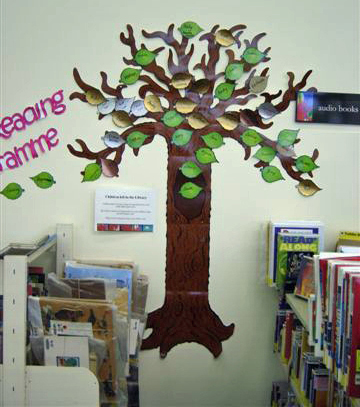
Raakau Reading Tree.

Children's programmes were in place from early on. Eleanor Fisher persuaded local residents to come in and read to youngsters during school holidays. Storytime went for an hour once a week, and up to 50 youngsters attended. Class visits by local schools started in 1954, and became a regular feature. Outside of this collaboration with schools the library offered reading programmes, such as "Go Bush" and later, as part of the North Shore Libraries, the Rakaau Reader scheme. This encouraged reading by setting targets coupled with incentives and visible marks of achievement, such as green, silver, then gold leaves on the Raakau tree (pictured).

From this the library became more involved in the provision of a wider range of holiday activities, like puppet shows and hands-on arts and crafts, such as making hats or murals or cake decorations. On one occasion these were so well subscribed the library held them down the road in the All Saints Church hall. There were events too on such occasions as the library's 50th celebration, and Halloween.

There have been regular appearances by authors, illustrators, storytellers and various speakers, and celebrities from Judy Bailey to Edith the Elf. Others include storyteller Lynne Kriegler, illustrators Trevor Pye, Margaret Beames, Robyn Belton, and Judy Lambert, and writers Lino Nelisi, Tom Bradley, and Jean Bennett, as well as Irish storyteller Nigel De Burca, and two of the Aunties. They were often invited as part of various book festivals, such as the Children's Aim Book Award. Competitions to select favourite reads further raised awareness and use of the books.

Lapsit for preschoolers with their parents was an innovation launched by then Chief Librarian Rata Graham in 1992. These were half-hour sessions of mostly music and song, as well as stories and finger puppetry. Lapsit proved so popular it was extended to twice a week in 1999. It was the precursor to "Rhymetime" now standardised across the entire North Shore Libraries system, a programme specifically designed to encourage active socialisation and the development of reading skills, through the focus on rhythm and rhyme.

== Public space ==
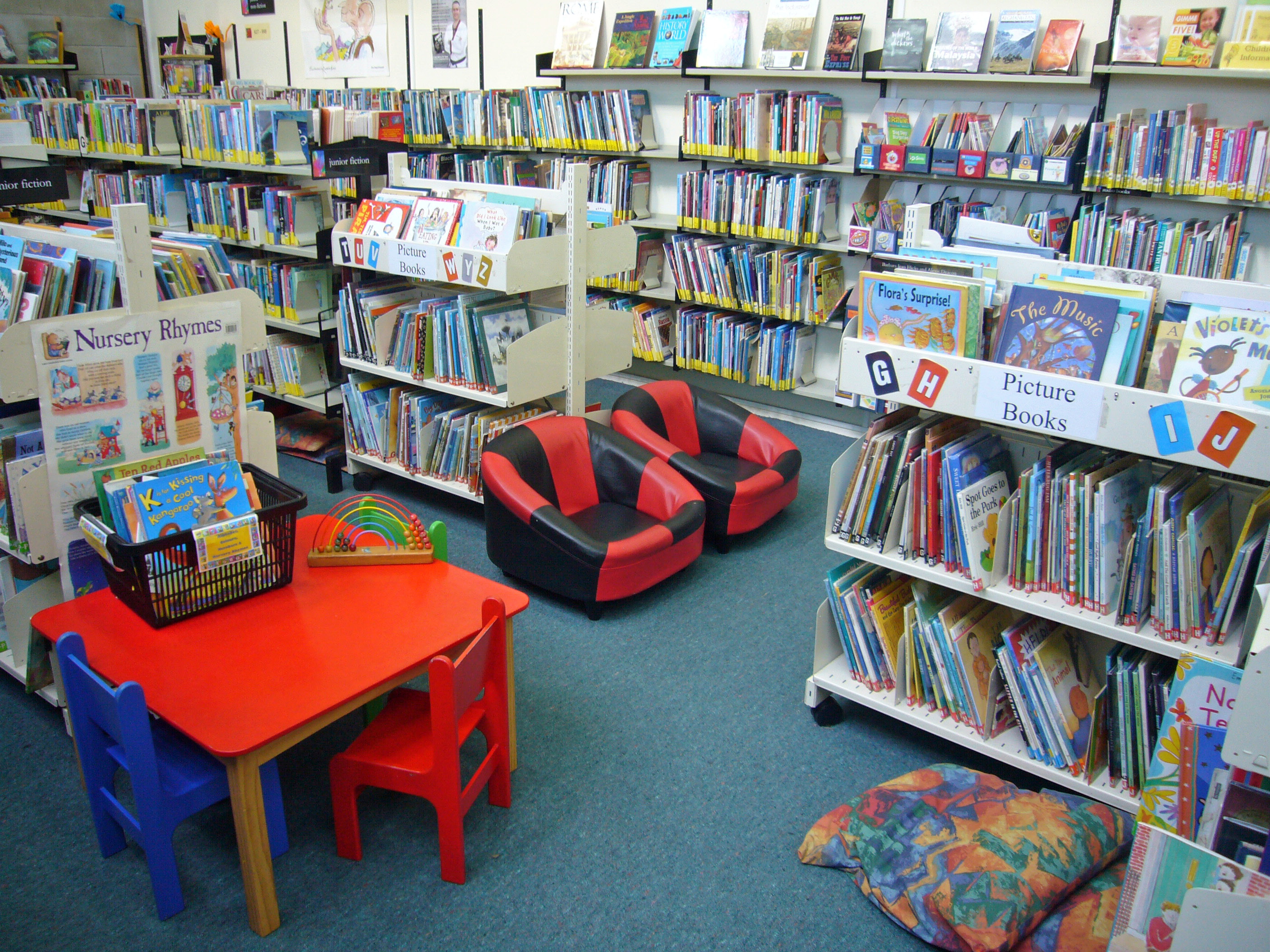
Public space in the Children's section of the temporary Birkenhead Library when it was located in the Leisure Centre.

The library has also tried to provide public space for various activities, such as study and leisure reading, though its history is marked by a struggle to do this consistently. The lack of space meant the popularity of the original library was something of an embarrassment. The 1968 building was more spacious, especially after later alterations. 1973 saw the addition of the mezzanine floor; and 1993, the addition of a Young Adult room, as well as a Large Print lounge. However, there was little room for much expansion, which led to the curtailment of some service development. This was one of the reasons for the new building project started in 2005. The temporary location in the Leisure Centre, offered two tables in the magazine-newspaper-computer area, along with a few sofa chairs. The Children's section also had some seating (pictured). But, after pressure from Cr Hartley the children's play equipment was cut back by more than half. The original costs was to spend $80,000 on the children and the final cost was only $30,000 and the landscaping was also slashed, a reduction that is reflected in the final arrangements.

== Mobile library ==
=== Origins ===
Located in central Highbury the library is about seven miles (11 km) distant from the more remote areas of Beach Haven and Birkdale. As a consequence, from the mid-1960s there was a persistent call to establish a more convenient branch location. Petitioned by residents the Borough Council considered the possibility of setting up something in the Beach Haven hall on a temporary basis, to see if it would take. They asked the then Chief Librarian Ann Clegg to prepare a report looking into the details.

Her conclusion that a branch was an expensive option, and that it would make more sense to expand the existing library, aggrieved locals. They felt her assertion that there was not enough demand by "serious readers" was a misrepresentation of the community's ability and very real need; while the three councillors who'd campaigned on a promise of getting something done proclaimed the report biased. The Beach Haven Residents and Ratepayers Association started a petition and gathered 700 signatures. There were angry letters in the paper.

In the event Birkenhead bought the mobile van off Takapuna in 1982. This was a 1949 Bedford chassis with a purpose-built body that had already been in service for 35 years, much of it as the first mobile library in Auckland. In fact, as part of the Takapuna City Council in 1977 it had been contracted to visit the outer Birkenhead area once a week. This was reminiscent of the Country Library van, a national service which used to visit Birkenhead Library itself several times a year during an earlier era.

=== Years of service ===
With its purchase Birkenhead greatly expanded the mobile service. Capable of stocking up to 2000 items the van now went out five days a week with a full range of items from adult fiction, to magazines, picture books and puzzles, constantly reinvigorated from the main library. As well, it provided a community noticeboard. The van stopped at a different place each day, generally staying between 10am and 4:30pm, closing only for lunch and tea-breaks. This was a length of time commensurate with weekend services. Within a few years though the more common practice was adopted of spending less time at a greater variety of locations.

Initially there were two staff to cope with the influx of registrations, but the sole position was quickly established with Cynthia McKenzie as Birkenhead's first Mobile Librarian. Over its decade of existence the Mobile had half a dozen different librarians, who had to cope with double de-clutching, a leaking roof and stifling heat, as well as the usual duties of a librarian.

=== Retirement ===
Issues dropped, and in 1988 the service was reduced from 5 to 2 days a week, in part perhaps due to increasing mechanical difficulties. The once famously reliable van had problems with its radiator ensuring it had to be constantly stopped and attended by the last Mobile Librarian, Malcolm Fletcher. Then it blew a head gasket. With the onset of amalgamation of Birkenhead into the wider North Shore Libraries it was superseded by the system Mobile anyway, and the Bedford was eventually retired in 1992. Not wanted by the Museum of Transport & Technology or the Devonport Museum it eventually went to the North Shore Vintage Car Club. Over its eleven years of operation it had issued over 163 thousand items.

== Webpage development ==
The North Shore Libraries catalogue was launched onto the Internet in June 1995. Shortly afterwards the branches began to demonstrate general internet usage to the public, then to roll out access. By May 1996 Birkenhead was having daily demonstrations. About this time, North Shore Libraries put up their first website. Datacom, whose main role was the provision of the libraries' online catalogue, created the website too, using AOLpress 1.2. This included the establishing of separate webpages for each branch.

=== A green look 1997–2003 ===
Birkenhead Library's own subsidiary webpage was already well established then, before its subsequent recording on the Internet Archives. It was sited two clicks in from the main page. There was a photo, and the predominant green of the layout matched the official Council colour used in its logo. From this static front a number of subpages could be accessed. These detailed basic facts about the library, such as location, opening hours, and staff contact details. This was to remain unchanged for about five years, apart from minor alterations, such as the inclusion of a branch phone number prominently displayed on the front page, and updates to reflect changes in staffing.

=== White with columns 2003–2009 ===
In 2003 a more elaborate three-column style was adopted. This marked a shift from Datacom's maintenance to the work of Mike Copley and Trine Romlund hired specifically to build a more functional and professional-looking website for the entire North Shore Libraries. They used PHP templates. Features included a range of photo thumbs illustrating aspects of the library and its services, and a brief note on the history of the library. Three significantly detailed related pages were also added: Birkenhead Local History Books for Sale, Birkenhead Library Collections and Services, and its subpage on the Chelsea Archives.

This remained the style and predominant content of the Birkenhead Library webpage into 2009. Only some minor details changed, such as the link from the North Shore Libraries main page reduced from three to two clicks with the utilisation of drop-down menus; and an increased cross-linking of hyperlinks throughout the North Shore Libraries website.

=== Current display ===
As part of the redesign of the North Shore Libraries website in July 2009 the Birkenhead page was revamped to its current layout.

== Artwork and exhibitions ==
The library has purchased or had donated a variety of artworks:

- Two bound folios of Charles Goldie prints and watercolour prints of Charles Heaphy. Donated in 1981 and 1983 respectively by Bob & Norma Inward, valued at $750 each.
- Bush walk painting. Presented by the Birkenhead Licensing Trust, valued at $1500. Also "some pottery" and a leatherbound album of the 1988 Birkenhead centenary.
- "Sands of Time in Piha," painting by Michelle Stuart. Donated by Birkenhead Licensing Trust.
- "Polymorphous," a bronzed ceramic sculpture, donated by Ian Firth.
- "Nga Aho Matauranga" (Connections of knowledge) by Toi Te Ritio Mahi.
- "Island Night," handscreen printed acrylic by Sue Pearson.
- Six mural panels. Were located on streetfront alongside main entrance of Civic Reserve Library. Featuring local history heritage of early pioneers, horticulture, sugar factory and township. Done by students from Birkenhead College.

There have also been a number of exhibitions, often work of local artists. These were usually presented on the mezzanine floor of the Civic Reserve library. The first exhibition was a display of books in 1955. Subjects ranged from "poetry to sheep mustering," and included works by William Satchell and Katherine Mansfield. The oldest item was a bible in Maori published in 1840. During the North Shore Arts Festival of 1966 there was an exhibition devoted exclusively to Maori books, sculpture and painting.

Other exhibitions include paintings by Pauline Thompson, Linda Mcneur-Wismer, Betty Eddington, and Susan Durrant, pottery by Peter Collis and Peter Shearer, prints by Julienne Francis, glass sculptures by Carl Houser, and copperwork by Andrew Campbell. A fabric art collection by locals was instigated by Rata Graham and displayed as part of the library's centenary celebrations.

== Support groups ==
Birkenhead library has had a number of support groups. Volunteers were instrumental in staffing the library in the early days; while the Birkenhead Rotary Club took down the old council quarters in preparation for the new 1968 building. They also donated money to set up the Reference Collection; and later, in 1982, they started the first collection of talking books. Similarly, the Plunkett club of 1980 raised $200 to buy 35 LP recordings of children's fairytales, songs and rhymes.

The Friends of Birkenhead Library were established in November 1990, under the patronage of Keith Sinclair, and continued under Thea Muldoon from 1994. They have advocated strongly for the library, most recently on behalf of the new building, drumming up support through meetings with the Community Board and in the local paper. Along with Plunkett they spoke up for the library at the Environment Court hearing. The Friends have also raised monies for various equipment, such as listening posts and the library's first camera, a Pentax. Speakers at their events have been diverse and have included historian Claudia Orange, writers Muriel Fisher, Sheridan Keith, and Rosemary Menzies, as well as Ann Hartley, a former mayor, Jenny Kirk, a former councillor, and Sergio Gulyaev, a Russian astronomer.

== Usage statistics ==
Published statistics extend to 2000, with most detail being recorded for the 1990s when Annual Reports were written for each branch. These statistics give an indication of usage of the library by a variety of measures including membership, issues (yearly and monthly), door count, stock size and number of reference queries.

=== Membership ===
No statistical correlation has been done with population growth, though the latter has been cited generally in connection with library usage. Also there has been some records of membership numbers in and of themselves, as well as a proportion of the total population. So, for example, in 1971 there were 8,752 members of a borough population of 15,825. That this meant over half the population were members was duly noted. However, by 1992 the population had increased to 31,860, while membership had only risen to 13,162. By 2003 there were 150 new registrations a month.

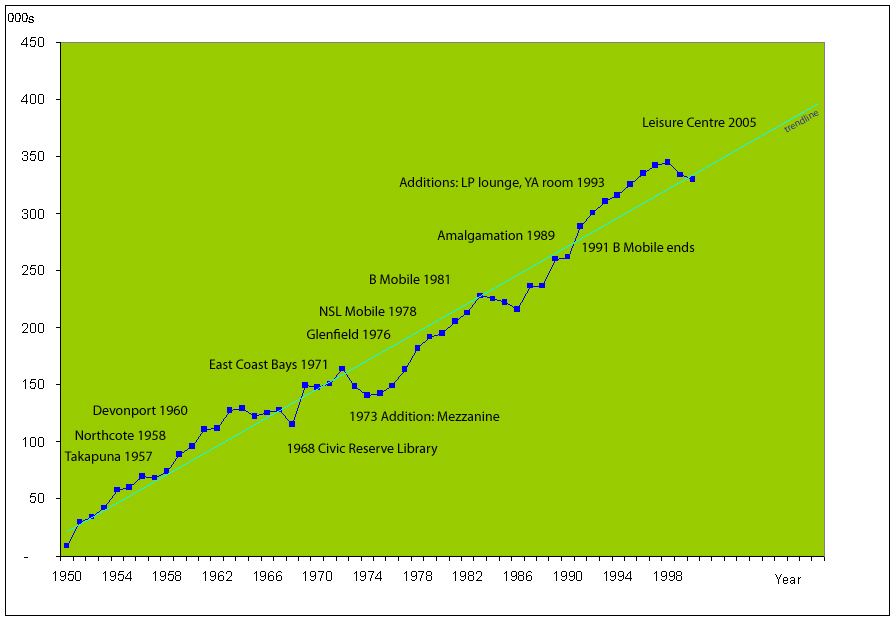
Annual issues at Birkenhead Library 1950–2000.

=== Issues ===
From the library's inception issues have risen steadily with minor fluctuations, from a little over 8,000 items in 1950 to over 300,000 at the turn of the century (pictured). To date the peak recorded year of the published data has been 1998. In 1957 when issues dropped for the first time, this was attributed to the opening of the Northcote Library. Similarly, while the Civic Reserve building was being constructed the library was relocated to a temporary shop site and the subsequent fall off in 1968 was attributed to this. Other trends visible from the graph include a dip in the 1970s and a rise in the 1990s. Data on the impact of the shift to the Leisure Centre has not been made publicly available yet.

Over its decade of existence the Birkenhead Mobile Library issued nearly 15,000 items a year. At one point, 1984, 24,128 items, equivalent to more than 10% of the building's issue; though on average about half that. On the other hand, Birkenhead as a subset of the whole North Shore Libraries system, has averaged 16% of the total issues. This figure excludes those early years when there were no other libraries on the North Shore, but includes the introduction of branches at Takapuna, Northcote, Devonport, East Coast Bays, Glenfield, and the system Mobile, as well as the start and cessation of Birkenhead's Mobile, the impact of amalgamation, and the shift to and from various buildings.

== Annotated bibliography ==
- Birkenhead Heritage Society (2020). A History of Birkenhead Library: 1901 to 2010. This is described as an updated history of the library, incorporating contributions from members of the society.
- Christie, Colleen. (1988). Back then: oral history interviews from the Birkenhead Public Library collection, vo1 1–3, Birkenhead: Birkenhead City Council. Recollections by retired local residents. As such, no sourcing or verification of claims within.
- Fisher, Muriel and Hilder, Wenman. (1969). Birkenhead: the kauri suburb, Birkenhead: Birkenhead Borough Council. A couple of pages on library only.
- Graham, Rata.(1992). Birkenhead Library: a history, Birkenhead: North Shore Libraries. Main resource putting library in historical context, with some analysis.
- Haddon, Kathy. (1993). Birkenhead: the way we were, Birkenhead: North Shore City Council. A couple of pages on library only.
- Internet Archive. Contains snapshots of early stages of North Shore Libraries website. Does not include images used or many subpages. No records of various OPACs or DRA software used.
- North Shore City Council. North Shore City district plan (operative in part) decisions on submissions and further submissions in respect of plan change 14 : re-zone Nell Fisher Reserve, Birkenhead. Takapuna: North Shore, 2006.
- . In particular, the Birkenhead-Northcote Community Board and the Community Services & Parks Committee. Full text of minutes, but appendixed reports not included.
- North Shore City Council media releases. Often published verbatim and unattributed in North Shore Times.
- North Shore Libraries. Annual reports: 1990–2000, Takapuna, North Shore City Council. Separate volumes for each year. Brief records of events for each branch, plus statistics. Little analysis, explanation or forecasting other than in City Librarian's prefaces.
- . See also the.
- North Shore Times, and other local newspapers. Different variants of NST can be confusing. On 23 June 1966, the North Shore Times and the North Shore Advertiser merged to become the North Shore Times Advertiser. Then on 9 March 2004, the name changed to North Shore Times. For index see the North Shore Times index.
- White & White Ltd. North Shore City Council Birkenhead building feasibility study. Tauranga: White & White Ltd, 2000, p4. Considers possibilities of refurbishment and complete rebuild options, i.e. well before any actual plan eventuated.
