= ArsDigita Community System =

Open source toolkit for developing community web applications

The ArsDigita Community System (ACS) was an open source toolkit for developing community web applications developed primarily by developers associated with ArsDigita Corporation. It was licensed under the terms of the GNU GPL, and is one of the most famous products to be based completely on AOLserver. Although there were several forks of the project, the only one that is still actively maintained is OpenACS.

Features of ACS included a core set of APIs, datamodels, and database routines for coordinating information common to all community web applications, as well as modules such as workflow management, CMS, messaging, bug/issue tracking, project tracking, e-commerce, and bboards.

== History ==
ACS was built in the mid-1990s to support the photo.net online community as well as a variety of Internet services from Hearst Corporation.

Its creator, ArsDigita, was founded in 1997 by developers such as Philip Greenspun. The initial developers included Tracy Adams, Ben Adida, Eve Andersson, Jin S. Choi, Philip Greenspun, Aurelius Prochazka, and Brian Tivol.

The ACS was originally written using the Oracle database and AOLserver threaded web server and thus was a combination of SQL, HTML templates, and Tcl code to merge database results with templates. ACS 3.4, however, was also available with Java Server Pages to run with Apache and Tomcat. In 2001, the code tree was forked, with the Tcl code base being maintained and refactored by one group of developers, while the product line was being re-written in Java EE.

In 2002, Red Hat acquired ArsDigita and all of its assets. As a result of this, the Java version was renamed "Red Hat CCM", and official support for the Tcl version ceased. However, the Tcl version continued to be maintained by the OpenACS community.

=== OpenACS ===
OpenACS
- Stable release: 5.10.1 (September 3, 2024; 16 months ago) [±]
- Preview release: N/A [±]
- License: GNU General Public License
- Website: openacs.org

The Open Architecture Community System provides:

- A set of applications, that can be used to deploy web sites that are strong on collaboration. Some of the applications are Workflow, CMS, Messaging, Bug/Issue tracker, e-commerce, blogger, chat and forums.
- An application development toolkit, that provides an extensive set of APIs and services to enable quick development of new applications. Features include permissioning, full internationalization, Ajax, form builder, object model, automated testing, subsites and a powerful package manager.

OpenACS runs on AOLserver and NaviServer with either Oracle or PostgreSQL as its database.

Projects that were or are based on OpenACS include dotLrn, dotFolio, dotCommunity, dotConsult, Project-Open, and Voice Online Communities.

== See also ==
- Web content management
- Solution stack
