= End-user computing =

Systems in which users can make apps

End-user computing (EUC) refers to systems in which non-programmers can create working applications. EUC is a group of approaches to computing that aim to better integrate end users into the computing environment. These approaches attempt to realize the potential for high-end computing to perform problem-solving in a trustworthy manner.

End-user computing can range in complexity from users simply clicking a series of buttons, to citizen developers writing scripts in a controlled scripting language, to being able to modify and execute code directly.

Examples of end-user computing are systems built using fourth-generation programming languages, such as MAPPER or SQL, or one of the fifth-generation programming languages, such as ICAD.

== Factors ==
Factors contributing to the need for further EUC research include knowledge processing, pervasive computing, issues of ontology, interactive visualization, and the like.

Some of the issues related to end-user computing concern software architecture (iconic versus language interfaces, open versus closed, and others). Other issues relate to intellectual property, configuration and maintenance. End-user computing allows more user-input into system affairs that can range from personalization to full-fledged ownership of a system.

== EUC strategy ==
EUC applications should not be evolved by accident, but there should be a defined EUC strategy. Any Application Architecture Strategy / IT Strategy should consider the white spaces in automation (enterprise functionality not automated by ERP / Enterprise Grade Applications). These are the potential areas where EUC can play a major role. Then ASSIMPLER parameters should be applied to these white spaces to develop the EUC strategy. (ASSIMPLER stands for availability, scalability, security, interoperability, maintainability, performance, low cost of ownership, extendibility and reliability.)

In businesses, an end-user concept gives workers more flexibility, as well as more opportunities for better productivity and creativity. However, EUC will work only when leveraged correctly. That’s why it requires a full-fledged strategy. Any strategy should include all the tools users might need to carry out their tasks and work more productively.

Types of EUC

End-user computing covers a broad range of user-facing resources, including:

- desktop and notebook computers;
- desktop operating systems and applications;
- scripting languages such as robotic desktop automation or RDA;
- smartphones and wearables;
- mobile, web and cloud applications;
- virtual desktops and applications

== EUC risk drivers ==
Business owners should understand that every user-controlled app needs to be monitored and supervised. Otherwise, organization risk facing a lot of problems and losses if end-users don’t follow company policy or leave their job. In functions such as finance, accounting and regulated activities, unmanaged EUC may expose the organization to regulatory compliance issues and fines.

End-user computing operating and business risks may be driven by:

- lack of rigorous testing;
- lack of version & change control;
- lack of documentation and reliance on end-user who developed it;
- lack of maintenance processes;
- lack of security;
- lack of audit trail;
- overreliance on manual controls.

== EUC risk management software ==
Many companies elect to leverage software to manage their EUC risks. Software can provide many benefits to organizations, including:

- automation of risk management activities;
- reduction in manual effort required for manual controls;
- version controls for EUC applications;
- change controls for EUC applications.

Examples of EUC risk software include:

- apparity

== See also ==
- Decentralized computing
- Defensive computing
- End-user development
- Journal of Organizational and End User Computing
- Knowledge-based engineering
- Situational application
- Software engineering
- Usability
- Usability engineering
- User interface
- User-centered design
