= Holly Yanco =

American roboticist

Holly Ann Yanco is an American roboticist and computer scientist who works as Distinguished University Professor of computer science at the University of Massachusetts Lowell, and the director of the New England Robotics Validation and Experimentation (NERVE) center. She is known for her research in human–robot interaction, and has applied robotics as a way to broaden interest in computer science by schoolchildren, in assistive technology, in manufacturing, and for rescue robots. Yanco is a Fellow of the American Association for the Advancement of Science.

== Education and career ==
Yanco became interested in robotics in middle school, and went to high school in Northborough, Massachusetts. She is a 1991 graduate of Wellesley College, and completed her Ph.D. at the Massachusetts Institute of Technology in 2000. Her dissertation, Shared User-Computer Control of a Robotic Wheelchair System, was supervised by Rodney Brooks.

Yanco taught at Wellesley, Boston College, and ArsDigita University before taking her present position at UMass Lowell in July 2001. She founded the university's Human-Robot interaction Lab, and helped develop the combined art and computer science program Artbotics for high school and university students.

== Recognition ==
Yanco was elected as an AAAI Fellow in 2021, by the Association for the Advancement of Artificial Intelligence, "for foundational contributions to the field of human-robot interaction and for exceptional leadership in education and broadening participation".

In 2023, Yanco was elected a Fellow of the American Association for the Advancement of Science.
