= David C. Cole =

David C. Cole (born September 24, 1952) is an entrepreneur and philanthropist. He first became successful in the publishing, communications, software, online services, and consumer products industries. Then he organized several efforts for local agriculture.

== Biography ==
Cole grew up in Kailua, Hawaii and graduated with a Liberal Arts Degree from the University of Hawaii at Manoa in 1975. In 1997, the university honored him with the UH Distinguished Alumni Award and in 2004 with an honorary doctorate degree.

From 1976 through 1980 he held a variety of positions, starting with selling Prentice-Hall textbooks, rising to become manager of a consulting firm serving emerging software companies. From 1981 through 1984 he was chairman, president and chief executive officer of software company Ashton-Tate. From 1985 through 1987 he was president of Ziff Communications, part of the Ziff Davis Publishing Group. Since the 1980s Cole invested in early-stage technology companies, including Macromedia, Shiva Corporation (acquired by Intel Corporation), and Tops, Inc. (acquired by Sun Microsystems Inc.). In 1993 Cole became chairman, president and chief executive officer of NaviSoft, an Internet-based software provider.

When NaviSoft was acquired by America Online in 1994, Cole became an AOL officer. At America Online, Cole initially was president of AOL’s Internet Services Company then president of AOL New Enterprises group. He held operating responsibility for AOL International, AOL Enterprises, Digital City and AOL corporate development.

== Agriculture ==
In 1996, Cole bought 425-acre (1.72 km^{2}) farm called Sunnyside Farms in Rappahannock County, Virginia. Upon leaving America Online in 1997, he focused on organic farming. He worked to remove diseased trees, restore the soil, install an irrigation system and gain organic certification for Sunnyside Farms, which became a major retailer and supplier of premium organic meats and produce in mid-Atlantic markets. Since 1997, Cole has been president of Aquaterra, Inc., an investment management firm that serves as managing general partner for Pan Pacific Ventures and Catalyst II, partnerships with interests in software, real estate, agriculture, retailing, and consumer products. He sold Sunnyside in 2006.

On October 15, 2003, Cole was appointed chairman, president and chief executive officer of Maui Land & Pineapple Company. Former AOL Time Warner Chairman Steve Case was a large stockholder of Maui Land & Pineapple. During Cole's appointment, the company reinvested in its three primary business divisions: agriculture including Maui Pineapple Company, the resort and real-estate through the Kapalua Land Company. Partnerships to invest in renewable energy and sustainability initiatives included the Sustainable Living Institute of Maui (SLIM), started in 2004, and Hawaii BioEnergy formed in 2006 to research renewable energy in Hawaii. In 2006, plans were announced to expand Kapalua Resort with a Ritz-Carlton Hotel.

Cole was reported as the second highest paid executive in Hawaii for 2007, despite missing five of seven performance goals. On June 11, 2008, Kamehameha Day, he rang the closing bell of the New York Stock Exchange to celebrate MLP's move from AMEX. Lehman Brothers, who had provided the financing for the Kapalua expansion, declared bankruptcy in September. After losses through 2008, Cole was replaced as of January 1, 2009. The Kapalua loan was in default, and finally was foreclosed in 2010.

== Other affiliations ==
From 1997 through 2004 Cole was director of Healthnotes, Inc., a publisher of peer-reviewed nutritional and health information for retailers and consumers. In 2001 Cole became a partner in Twin Farms, a luxury resort in Vermont. He served as director of Hawaii BioEnergy, Grove Farm, Hawaii Superferry, Hawaiian Electric Company, and Sesame Workshop. Other affiliations include Chancellor’s Advisory Council of Maui Community College and Kamehameha Schools Board of Advisors. Cole is a former director of PBS' Sesame Workshop, the World Wildlife Fund, American Farmland Trust, and Island Press.

Cole served on The Nature Conservancy's national Board of Governors from 1991 through 2000 and its Asia-Pacific Council since its inception. In 2004 he was elected chairman of The Nature Conservancy of Hawaii. Cole served on the Hawaii Board from 1988 to 2000.
