= Lino Nelisi =

Niuen-born New Zealand author and educator

- Born: 1952 (age 73–74); Avatele, Niue
- Education: University of Auckland

Lino Nelisi (born 1952) is a Niuean-born New Zealand author, educator, and Niue language and culture expert. She is the author of over 20 books for primary school children.

== Biography ==
Nelisi was born in 1952 in Avatele, Niue. Her father Ugamea Levi was from Avatele, and mother, Peko, was Samoan. After training at Niue Teachers Training College she taught in Niue for seven years.

She moved to New Zealand in 1977 and worked in a factory, and then a hotel. In 1983 she enrolled at the Auckland College of Education to return to teaching. She worked as a primary teacher in Auckland from 1984. She began writing children's stories to provide reading material for her Pacific students. She has published in several Pacific languages, including in English, Māori, Samoan, Tongan, Niuean, Tokelauan, Cook Island Māori and Spanish.

Nelisi was the first Pacific Island student to graduate with a master's degree in education (Pasifika Education) from the University of Auckland Epsom Campus. Her thesis was the first one translated into Vagahau Niue.

In 2015, Nelisi was the writer in residence at St Joseph's School, Otahuhu.

== Published works ==
She has published a number of books for children including:

- Te taro O Sione (1992)
- Aiani moe Pia aitu (1993)
- Koe ama uga (1994)
- Venise and the little red radio (1996)
- Siones' Tale (1992)
- Koe tale ha Sione (1993)
- O le talo Sione (1993)
- Fishing with Spiderwebs (1994)
- Sione Went Fishing (1996)
- Thats the way (1998)
- El taro de Sione (1996)
- Tāne te whetū o te rā (1997)
- Tane steals the show (1997)
- He ika mawhitiwhiti pungawerewere (2000)
- Ko e Pele Kilikiki (2003)
- The Blue Roses (2010)

She has also published an autobiography, From Niue To The World : Stories From My Life Koe e Tau Lalolagi Haaku.

== Awards and honours ==
In the AIM Children's Book Awards, O le talo Sione (1993) was a finalist in 1993 and Fishing with Spiderwebs was a finalist in 1995. Tāne te whetū o te rā (and its English translation Tane steals the show) was a finalist in the Picture Book category at the 1998 New Zealand Book Awards for Children and Young Adults.
