= ArsDigita =

Web development company

ArsDigita, LLC
- Industry: Software
- Founded: 1997; 29 years ago in Cambridge, Massachusetts
- Founders: Philip Greenspun; Tracy Adams; Ben Adida; Eve Andersson; Olin Shivers; Aurelius Prochazka; Jin Choi
- Defunct: 2002; 24 years ago
- Fate: Acquired by Red Hat
- Products: ArsDigita Community System
- Divisions: ArsDigita Foundation

ArsDigita, LLC, was a web development company founded in Cambridge, Massachusetts in 1997. The company produced a popular open source toolkit, the ArsDigita Community System (ACS), for building database-backed community websites, and flourished at the peak of the dot-com bubble. ACS was also the roots of OpenACS, which added PostgreSQL as a database option and gave the system a fully open-source stack.

== History ==
=== Foundation ===
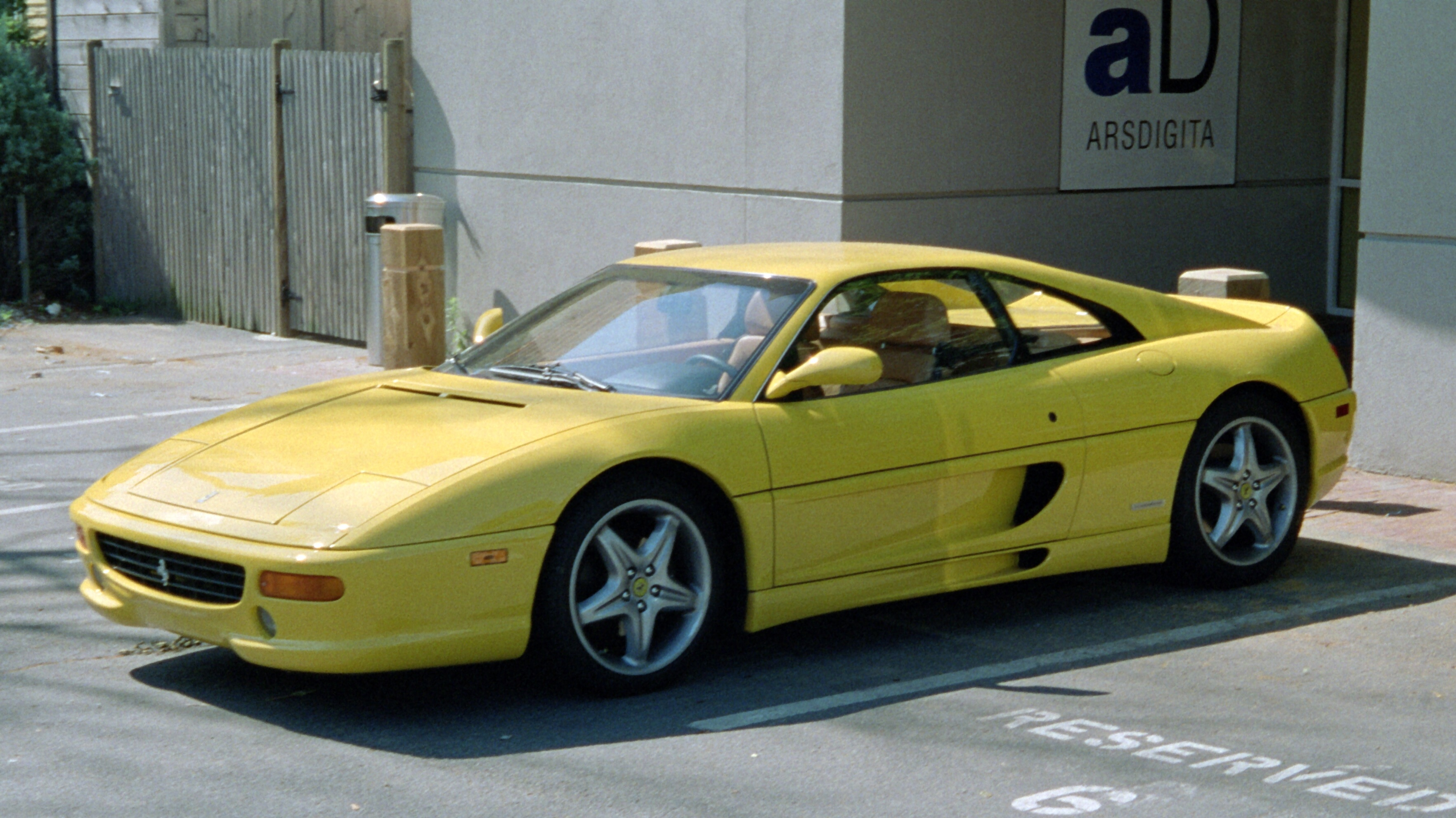
F355 parked outside the headquarters of ArsDigita

ArsDigita was founded by Philip Greenspun, Tracy Adams, Ben Adida, Eve Andersson, Olin Shivers, Aurelius Prochazka, and Jin Choi. Recruitment for the company was touted heavily by Greenspun, and ArsDigita became notorious among the "elite geeks" as a place where recruiting could result in significant payoffs. During the spring of 1999, for example, recruiting 5 hires would earn the employee a Honda S2000. Recruiting 10 employees would net a Ferrari F355. A trophy F355 in bright yellow was kept parked outside of the Prospect Street office in Cambridge to entice employees into recruiting. Later in the summer of 1999, as new management was brought on board, the policy was quietly changed to a lease of the cars, not outright ownership.

=== ArsDigita Foundation and ArsDigita University ===
The founders set up a nonprofit organization, the ArsDigita Foundation, which sponsored the ArsDigita Prize, a programming contest for high-school students held in 1999, 2000, and 2001.

In 2000, a free intensive one-year post-baccalaureate program in computer science was announced, called ArsDigita University. It was based on the undergraduate course of study at the Massachusetts Institute of Technology (MIT) and financed and supported by the ArsDigita Foundation. The majority of the instructors were professors from MIT and the program was tuition free.

Potential recruits were required to submit solutions to a handful of problem sets used in an Internet application development course at MIT. Some of these problem sets required the use of the Oracle object-relational database management system behind Web pages. Others were basic computer science problems such as computing a Fibonacci series recursively using the Tcl programming language.

After running from September 2000 through July 2001, seeing the first class to graduation, the dissolution of the ArsDigita Foundation forced the program to shut down. Most of the course lectures were videotaped. The tapes and other course materials are available free under the Open Content License from aduni.org, a website maintained by the alumni of the university. That site exists to carry on the school's mission of supplying free education, and streams ~150GB/month of lectures to thousands of people around the world. A 4-DVD set containing the videos and course materials (problem sets, exams, solution sets, and course notes) is also available for a fee. The tapes were made available on Google Video in 2008 allowing easier and more flexible access.

Former instructor Holly Yanco became a University of Massachusetts Lowell computer science professor and was named a 2013 Woman to Watch.

=== Dissolution ===
Approximately 180 ArsDigita employees were hired at the company's peak, but with the crash of the dot-com economy, many of ArsDigita's clients went out of business. Others cut back heavily on their technology initiatives. The weight of payroll and offices in Cambridge, Berkeley, California, Washington D.C., and Ann Arbor, Michigan soon overwhelmed the company. The Ann Arbor office was closed in September, 2000, with the other offices following over the next few months.

ArsDigita took $38 million in venture capital investment from Greylock and General Atlantic in 2000 to provide working capital for expansion of its product line. Greenspun said the venture capitalists staged an internal coup to drive the founders out of the management structure and installed incompetent professional managers with little idea of how to run a software products company, resulting in the collapse of the company and a lawsuit between the founding shareholders and the venture capitalists over control of management. Michael Yoon, who was an ArsDigita employee at the time, said ArsDigita had other management problems as well. The lawsuit was settled out of court with Greenspun receiving $7.6M.

In 2002, ArsDigita's main assets (including the pinball machine and several pieces of artwork) were acquired by Red Hat.
