= NaviSoft =

Web hosting company, acquired by AOL in 1994

- Type: Subsidiary of AOL
- Industry: Internet, Software, Web Server, Web Publishing
- Founded: 1993
- Headquarters: Goleta, California USA (as an independent company); Dulles, Virginia USA (after becoming part of AOL)
- Key people: Linda Dozier (CTO) and David C. Cole (CEO)
- Products: NaviServer, NaviPress
- Parent: AOL (after 1994)

NaviSoft was an American web server, web publishing and web hosting company founded in 1993 and based in Goleta, California. It was among the earliest companies to offer an integrated suite of internet publishing tools, combining a high-performance programmable web server (NaviServer) with a WYSIWYG HTML authoring tool (NaviPress) and a public hosting service at public.navisoft.com. AOL acquired NaviSoft on 30 November 1994 and subsequently used its technology as a foundation for AOL's internet services infrastructure.

== Products ==
NaviSoft's core products were NaviServer, a programmable web server designed for high-traffic deployments, and NaviPress, a WYSIWYG editor that allowed users to create and publish HTML pages without writing code directly. These were notable for being among the first tools to bring web publishing within reach of non-technical users. The public.navisoft.com hosting service allowed customers to publish pages directly from NaviPress to a public website.

== History ==
NaviSoft was founded in 1993 in Goleta, California. AOL acquired the company on 30 November 1994. Under AOL ownership, the products were rebranded: NaviServer became AOLserver, NaviPress became AOLpress, and the hosting service became AOL PrimeHost. AOL continued to offer these products through its Internet Services Company.

In 1995, AOL also acquired the Global Network Navigator (GNN) and offered NaviSoft's products under the GNN brand as well.

AOL eventually discontinued the WYSIWYG authoring tool and hosting services, but continued using AOLserver internally to run its web services infrastructure. In 1999, AOL released the AOLserver source code as open source under the GNU and AOLServer Public Licence. A community fork of version 4.10 of the AOLserver codebase was subsequently released and maintained as NaviServer.
