= AOLpress =

HTML editor

- AOLpress software icon
- AOLpress on Windows 2000
- Original author: NaviSoft
- Developer: AOL
- Release: February 1994; 32 years ago
- Final release: 2.0
- Operating system: Windows 95, Windows NT
- Type: HTML editor

AOLpress is a discontinued HTML editor that was available from America Online (AOL). It was originally developed as NaviPress by the company NaviSoft before being bought by AOL. It was discontinued in 2000. However, the last version (2.0) may still be found on some Web sites for downloading.

AOLpress was rather strict about enforcing legal HTML: when saving edited pages that were created outside AOLpress, code that did not conform to the HTML 3.2 standard and specifications may have been changed to do so. Today, the HTML code used is very outdated and may not work correctly in modern browsers. Several features common in current browsers, such as png images, are not supported.

== History ==
In February 1994, NaviSoft Inc. released NaviPress, which was a Web browser with an integrated HTML editor. NaviPress was very similar to the first Web browser, WorldWideWeb, created by Tim Berners-Lee, for the classic Mac OS and Microsoft Windows. According to Berners-Lee, "NaviPress was a true browser and editor, which produced clean HTML."

In late 1995, AOL acquired NaviSoft, and the package was renamed "GNNPress", then later "AOLpress", and made available for downloading on AOL's Global Network Navigator site. AOL then allowed each user to publish up to 2 megs on the web.

In Weaving the Web, Berners-Lee attributes the death of AOLpress to the release of Netscape Navigator 2.0 in 1996. AOL's Steve Case reached an agreement with Bill Gates so that AOL users could use a version of the Internet Explorer browser, which did not have HTML editing functionality. This agreement led to the decline of AOLpress. According to Berners-Lee, AOLpress was, at the time, "one of the few commercial browsers that provided simple online editing."

In 1998, AOLpress made PC Magazine's "Best Products of the Year" issue. The editors describe it as "the only program that combines WYSIWYG Web page editing, HTML source code editing, Web site management, and Web browsing in a single interface." The article goes on to say that AOLpress "isn't simply an editor that looks like a browser. It is a browser."

== System requirements ==
AOLpress 2.0 requires 8 megabytes of RAM, with more recommended, a display capable of at least 256 colors, an Intel 80386 CPU, 8 megabytes of free disk space, and either Windows NT or Windows 95 operating system.

While the installer is 16-bit and will not work under 64-bit Windows to install the software, AOLpress is capable of launching even under Windows 8, though it generally crashes within a short time after starting. Although the program is not accepted by Windows 7, it will run in compatibility mode in Windows 10.
