= Philip Greenspun =

American computer scientist and entrepreneur

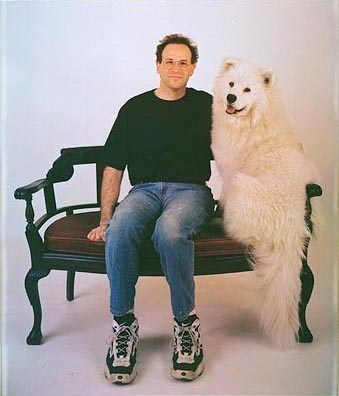
- Philip and Alex, 1997, by Elsa Dorfman
- Born: September 28, 1963 (age 63); Bethesda, Maryland, U.S.
- Education: Massachusetts Institute of Technology (BS, PhD)
- Known for: Developing database-backed Internet applications and online learning communities
- Scientific career
- Fields: Computer science
- Thesis: Architecture and Implementation of Online Communities (1999)
- Doctoral advisor: Patrick Winston, Tom Knight (scientist), Gill Pratt
- Website: philip.greenspun.com

Philip Greenspun (born September 28, 1963) is an American computer scientist, educator, early Internet entrepreneur, and pilot who was involved in developing online communities such as photo.net.

== Early life and education ==
Greenspun was born on September 28, 1963, grew up in Bethesda, Maryland, and received a B.S. in Mathematics from MIT in 1982. After working for HP Labs in Palo Alto and Symbolics, he became a founder of ICAD, Inc. Greenspun returned to MIT to study electrical engineering and computer science, receiving a Ph.D.

== 1990s era Internet entrepreneur ==
In 1993, Greenspun co-founded photo.net, an online community for people helping each other to improve their photographic skills. He seeded the community with "Travels with Samantha", a photo-illustrated account of a trip from Boston to Alaska and back; Samantha was how Greenspun referred to his Macintosh PowerBook 170 that he used to photo document his journey. Photo.net was co-founded with Rajeev Surati and Waikit Lau. Having grown to 600,000 registered users, it was acquired by NameMedia in 2007 for $6 million, according to documents filed in connection with a planned public offering of NameMedia shares.

In 1995, Greenspun was hired to lead development of Hearst Corporation's Internet services, which included early e-commerce sites. He was also an early developer of database-backed web sites, which became the dominant approach to engineering sites with user contributions. Greenspun's Oracle-based community site LUSENET was an important early host of free forums.

Working with Isaac Kohane of Boston Children's Hospital and Harvard Medical School, Greenspun co-developed an early web-based electronic medical record systems in 1996. Greenspun and Kohane continued to work together on medical informatics at Harvard Medical School.

=== ArsDigita ===
Greenspun founded the open-source software company ArsDigita in 1996. As CEO, he grew it to about $20 million in revenue before accepting any venture capital investments.

Greenspun and his co-founders at ArsDigita also established a non-profit foundation that ran the ArsDigita Prize, an award for young web developers, and the ArsDigita University, a tuition-free one-year program teaching core computer science curriculum. Winners of the Prize included a 12-year-old Aaron Swartz.

== Publications ==
Greenspun has written several textbooks on developing Internet applications, including:

- Philip and Alex's Guide to Web Publishing
- SQL for Web Nerds and
- Software Engineering for Internet Applications
- Database backed Web sites: the thinking person's guide to Web publishing; used as a textbook for an MIT course ISBN 9781562765309

About 20 years later, Greenspun became the editor of Medical School 2020, which provides a first-person account by a medical student. He updates a regular blog on his personal website.

== Aviation ==
Greenspun was employed as a commercial pilot for Delta Air Lines subsidiary Comair from 2008 until it ceased operation in 2012. He holds an Airline Transport Pilot License and Flight Instructor certificates for both airplanes and helicopters, as well as type ratings for two turbojet-powered airplanes.

The Massachusetts Institute of Technology publishes an aviation ground school program for private pilots, co-taught by Greenspun on its OpenCourseware site.

== Teaching ==
Greenspun is currently a professor at MIT and Harvard Medical School.

== Charitable work ==
In 2007, Greenspun donated $20,000 to the Wikimedia Foundation to fund a project to pay illustrators who contributed work for Wikipedia.

In December 2013, Greenspun donated to Kids on Computers (KOC), a 501(c)(3) non-profit which sets up computer labs countries where children do not have access to technology. In recognition of Greenspun's donation, a KOC lab was named the Gittes Family Lab in honor of his grandfather. Avni Khatri, president of Kids on Computers in 2012 credits her time at ArsDigita as where she learned the value of free and open-source software (FOSS) and how it can help bridge and connect virtual and real-world communities.

Greenspun is a volunteer for Angel Flight, transporting kidneys from donors to recipients.

== See also ==
- Greenspun's tenth rule
