= Jim Young (boat builder) =

New Zealand boat builder (1925–2020)

Jim Young ONZM
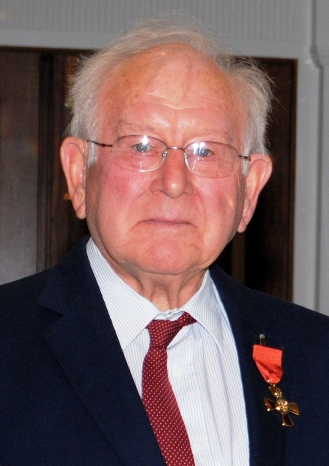
- Young in 2012
- Born: James Harold Young; 7 July 1925; Wellington, New Zealand
- Died: 18 June 2020 (aged 94); Auckland, New Zealand
- Occupations: Boat designer and builder

James Harold Young ONZM (7 July 1925 – 18 June 2020) was a New Zealand sailor, boat designer and builder.

== Early life and family ==
Born in Wellington on 7 July 1925, Young was the son of Cyril Ernest Young and Daisy Winifred Young (née Babington) of Lower Hutt. He moved to Auckland when he was 10 years old, and began a boatbuilding apprenticeship in 1940, working on general boat maintenance and the construction of wooden naval vessels until 1945. He served in Japan as part of J-Force in 1946.

== Boat design and building ==
After returning from Japan, Young began designing and building yachts, first at a shed in Little Shoal Bay, Birkenhead, and then in Takapuna. In 1949, he won the Sanders Cup in a 14-foot X class yacht that he designed, built and skippered himself. Over the next seven decades, he designed and built numerous innovative boats, including keelboats and catamarans that were successful in racing both in New Zealand and internationally. He is best known for designing the Young88 and Rocket31 (both keelboats), and the Vindex range of wooden cruising boats.

Young employed Bruce Farr, who would go on to become New Zealand's leading boat designer, as a boatbuilder designer when the latter was a teenager.

In the 2012 New Year Honours, Young was appointed an Officer of the New Zealand Order of Merit, for services to boat building.

== Death ==
Young died on 18 June 2020. A memorial service was held at the Royal New Zealand Yacht Squadron in Auckland.
