= Little Shoal Bay =

Bay in Auckland, New Zealand

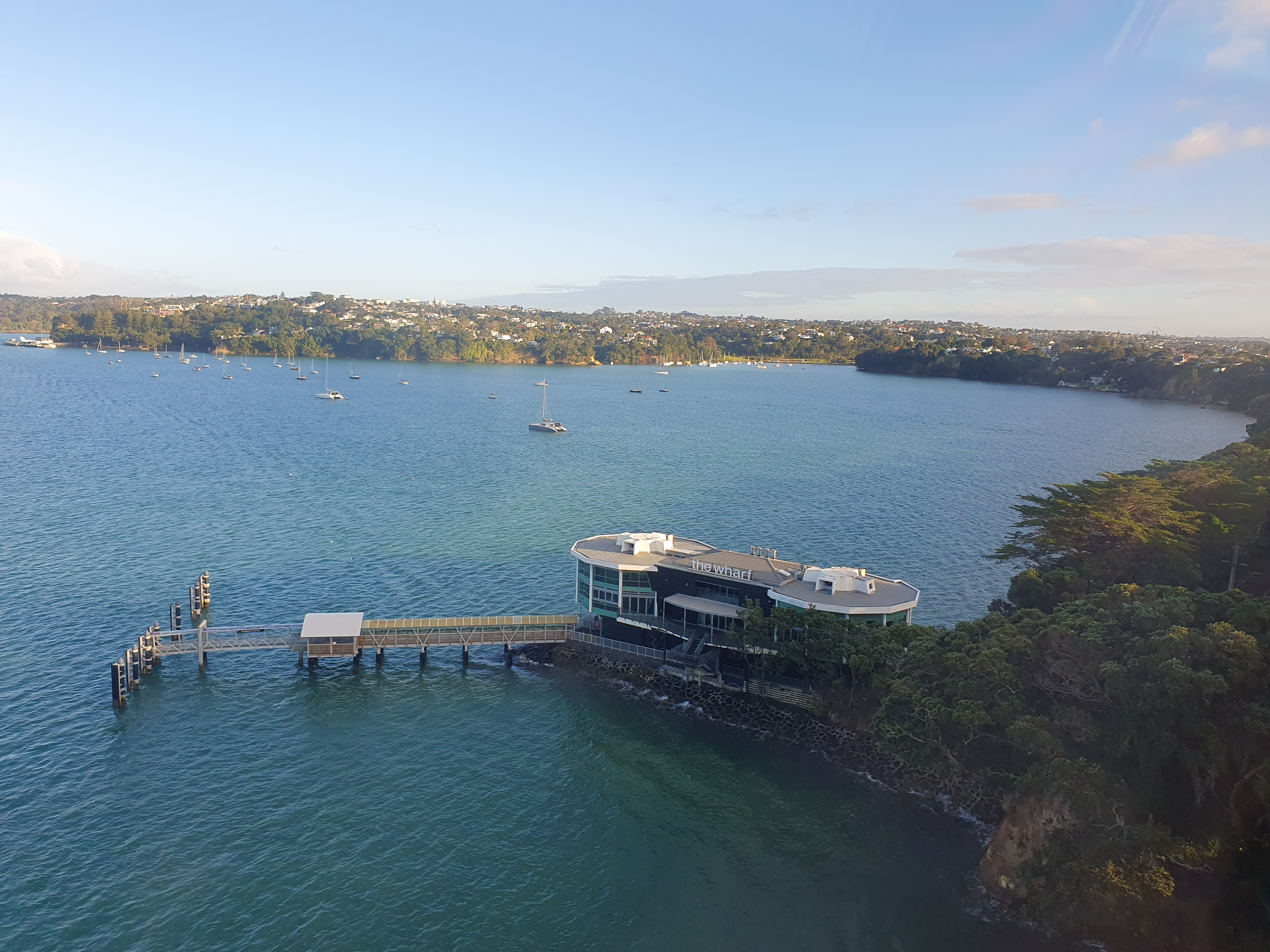
- View of Little Shoal Bay, Northcote Point Ferry Terminal and The Wharf events centre from the Auckland Harbour Bridge

- Location within the Auckland Region
- Location: Auckland Region, New Zealand
- Coordinates: 36.820°S 174.742°E
- Ocean/sea sources: Pacific Ocean
- Settlements: Birkenhead, Northcote

Little Shoal Bay is a bay of the Waitematā Harbour in Auckland, New Zealand. It is located on the North Shore, separating Birkenhead from Northcote. The Birkenhead and Northcote wharves are located at opposite sides of the bay.

== Geography ==
Little Shoal Bay is located on the North Shore, separating Birkenhead from Northcote, to the west of Shoal Bay. Halls Beach is found at Northcote in Little Shoal Bay. which is the location of Halls Beach. Le Roys Bush is an area of remnant native forest adjacent to Little Shoal Bay, which features an unnamed stream that flows into the bay.

== History ==
The traditional Tāmaki Māori name for Halls Beach is Onepoto, meaning "Short Beach"; a name which also referred to Sulphur Beach. The upper reaches of the bay were called Wai-manawa, referring to the mangroves that grew here. The southernmost shores of the bay were known as Okawau, referencing the Little black cormorant (kawau) that would congregate here. The Little Shoal Bay area was used for fishing and gathering shellfish, and was the location of kāinga, gardens, and a wāhi tapu.

Te Onewa Pā was constructed at the Northcote headland to the south of Little Shoal Bay, was prized for its strategic location and view over the Waitematā Harbour, and protected fisheries and kūmara gardens of the nearby volcanic soil.

In 1856, the Northcote Wharf was constructed at the mouth of Little Shoal Bay. In 1870, Peter Hall of the Winks and Hall cabinet makers settled at Little Shoal Bay. He became the namesake of Halls Beach.

From the 1840s, European settlers developed brickworks along Shoal Bay, the earliest being at Stanley Bay Beach. This was followed by Phillip Callan's brickyard at Sulphur Beach in 1843. From 1848, a soap and candle factory was established on Sulphur Beach, and other early industries included timber milling and kauri gum digging. In 1878, Auckland Chemical Works was established at Northcote, on the beach next to the brickworks. The factory processed sulphur from Moutohora Island in the Bay of Plenty, but was unprofitable, as the amount of sulphur estimated to be on the island was overestimated.

In 1902, the Birkenhead and Northcote Gas Company established a gasworks at Little Shoal Bay. By the 1920s, the gas works had become the biggest sole employer for the Northcote Borough, and in the 1950s the gasworks was shut down.

Boatbuilder Jim Young established his first boatyard at Little Shoal Bay in Birkenhead in the 1940s. In May 2024 Kaipātiki Local Board voted to terminate the boatyard's licence.

In 1959, the Auckland Harbour Bridge and Auckland Northern Motorway were opened in Auckland, crossing the Waitematā Harbour, to the south-east of Little Shoal Bay. In 1971, a seafood restaurant called Fisherman's Wharf was built by restaurateur Bob Sell, adjacent to Northcote wharf. While the restaurant closed two years later, the building is currently known as The Wharf, an events centre. There is a restaurant called Ariana on the top floor.

The Little Shoal Bay area is home to recreational facilities, including a tennis court, petanque court, basketball hoop and boardwalk.

== Bibliography ==
- Christmas, Judith (1983), A History of Northcote, Northcote Borough Council, OCLC 154573998, Wikidata Q123591383
- Verran, David (2010), The North Shore: An Illustrated History, North Shore: Random House, OL 33434370W, Wikidata Q120520385
