= Hillcrest, Auckland =

Hillcrest
- Suburb
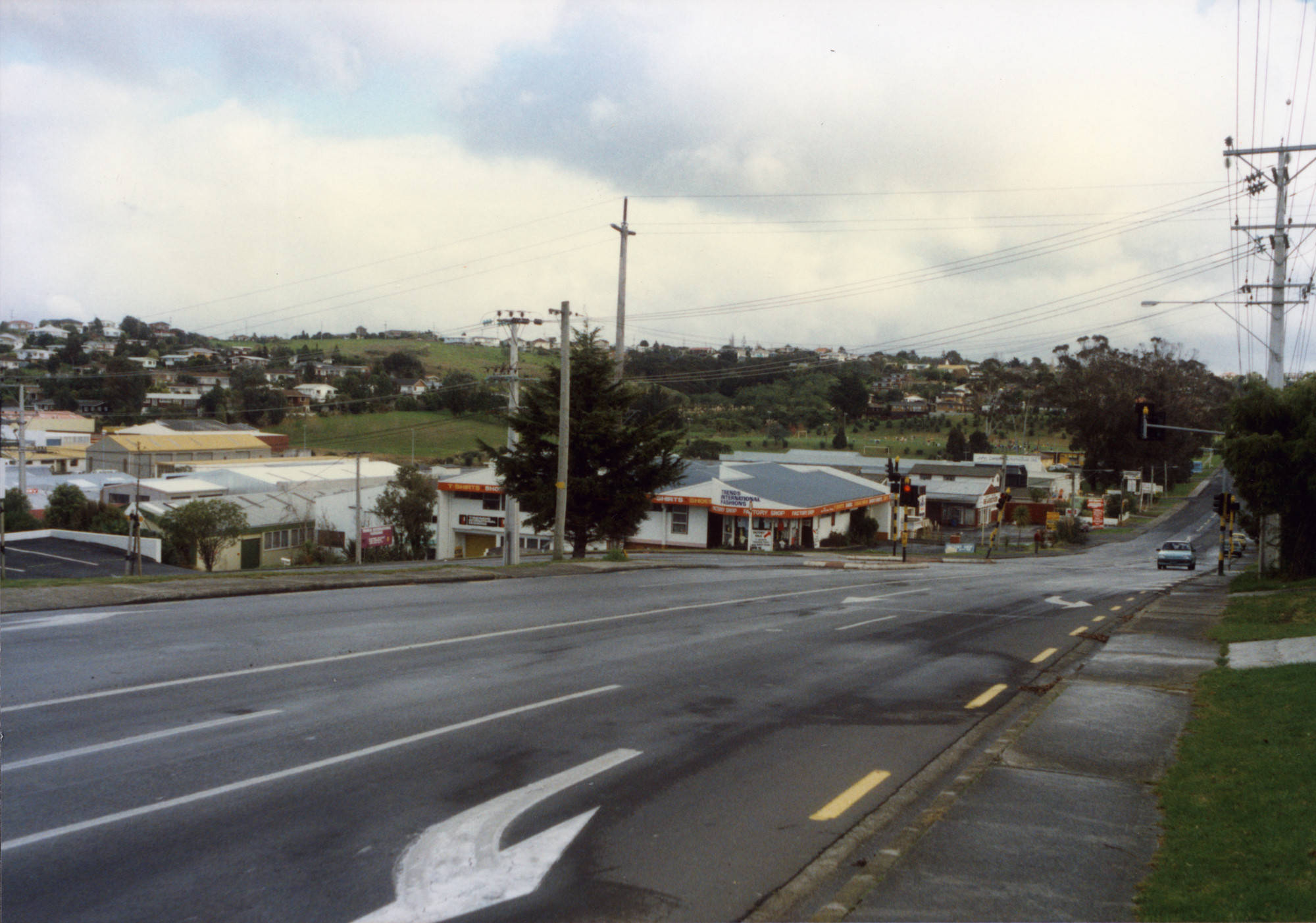
- View of Archers Road looking towards McFetridge Park in the 1980s
- Interactive map of Hillcrest
- Coordinates: 36.794°S 174.735°E
- Country: New Zealand
- City: Auckland
- Local authority: Auckland Council
- Electoral ward: North Shore Ward
- Local board: Kaipātiki Local Board

Area
  - Land: 293 ha (720 acres)

Population (June 2025)
  - Total: 11,570
  - Density: 3,950/km^{2} (10,200/sq mi)
- Postcode: 0627

Glenfield	Wairau Valley	Milford
Birkenhead	Hillcrest	Takapuna
Birkenhead	Northcote	Northcote

Hillcrest is a suburb of the contiguous Auckland metropolitan area located in New Zealand. Since 2010, it has been under the jurisdiction of the Auckland Council, and is located in the North Shore, surrounded by Glenfield, Wairau Valley, Northcote and Birkenhead. The Auckland Northern Motorway passes to the east.

== Etymology ==
The name Hillcrest was given to the suburb by developer Ewen Allison. Prior to this, the area was referred to by the name Sunnybrae, which refers to Mr. Nicholson's farm in western Northcote.

== Geology ==
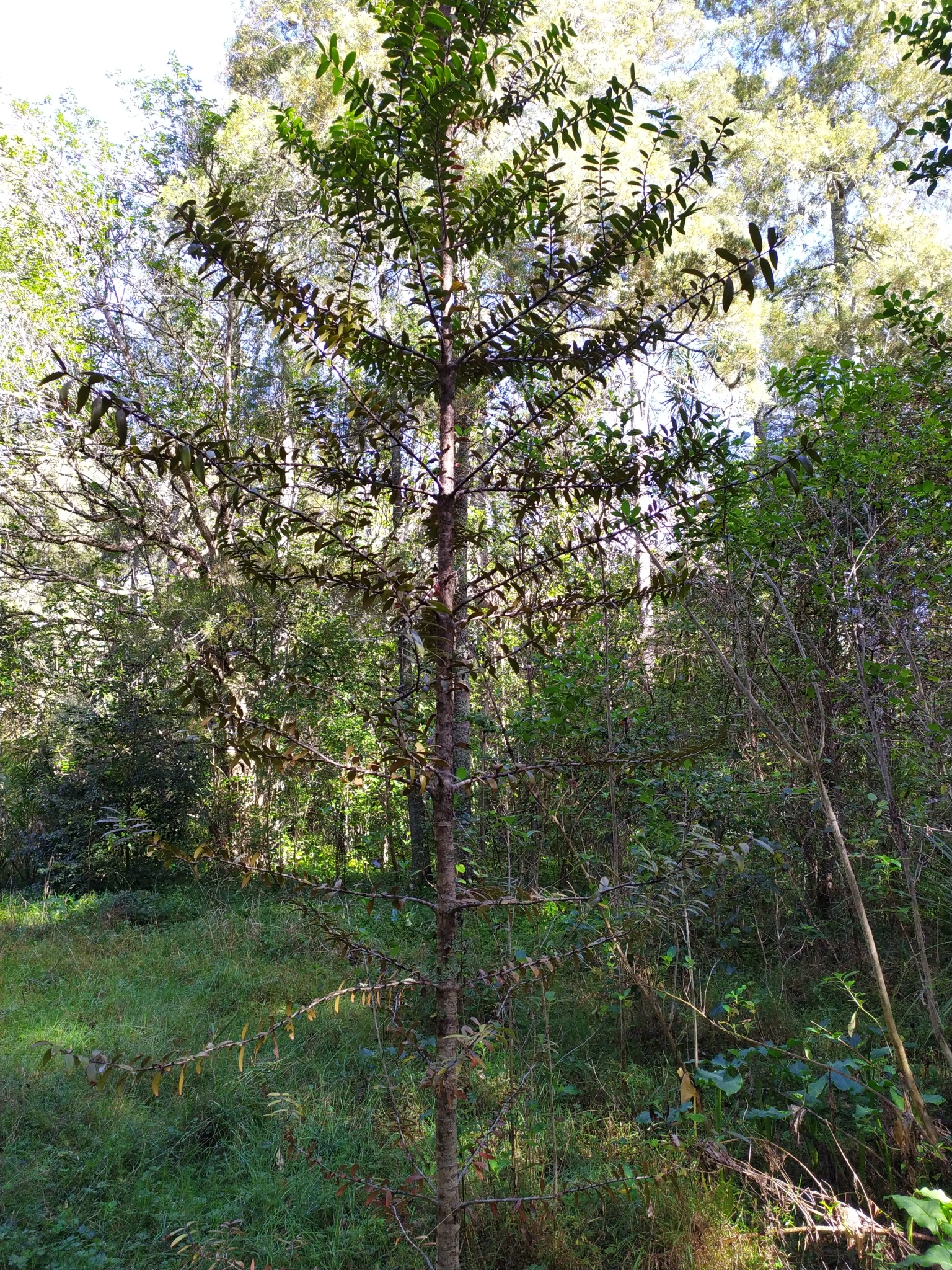
Regenerating kauri at Stancich Reserve

The Hillcrest area is primarily uplifted Waitemata Group sandstone, that was deposited on the sea floor during the Early Miocene, between 22 and 16 million years ago. Prior to human settlement, the inland North Shore was a mixed podocarp-broadleaf forest dominated by kauri.

Hillcrest Creek is a stream that flows east through the suburb, entering the Waitematā Harbour at Shoal Bay, east of the Auckland Northern Motorway. Until the 1970s, the upper reaches of the creek were primarily swampland. A traditional recorded name for Hillcrest Creek is Wakatatere "The Drifting Canoe", a name which recalls an incident where a tapu drifted into the stream at high tide.

Hillcrest is bordered by Sunnybrae Road and Ocean View Road in the east, Archers Road and Glenfield Road in the west, and Pupuke Road in the south. The highest point in the suburb is the hill at Speedy Crescent, which is 98 metres (322 ft) above sea-level. The second highest point is an 88 metres (289 ft) hill to the south on Pupuke Road, referred informally by residents in the early 20th century as Clay Hill. The hill is the location of the Pupuke Road Reservoir and Pump Station.

== History ==
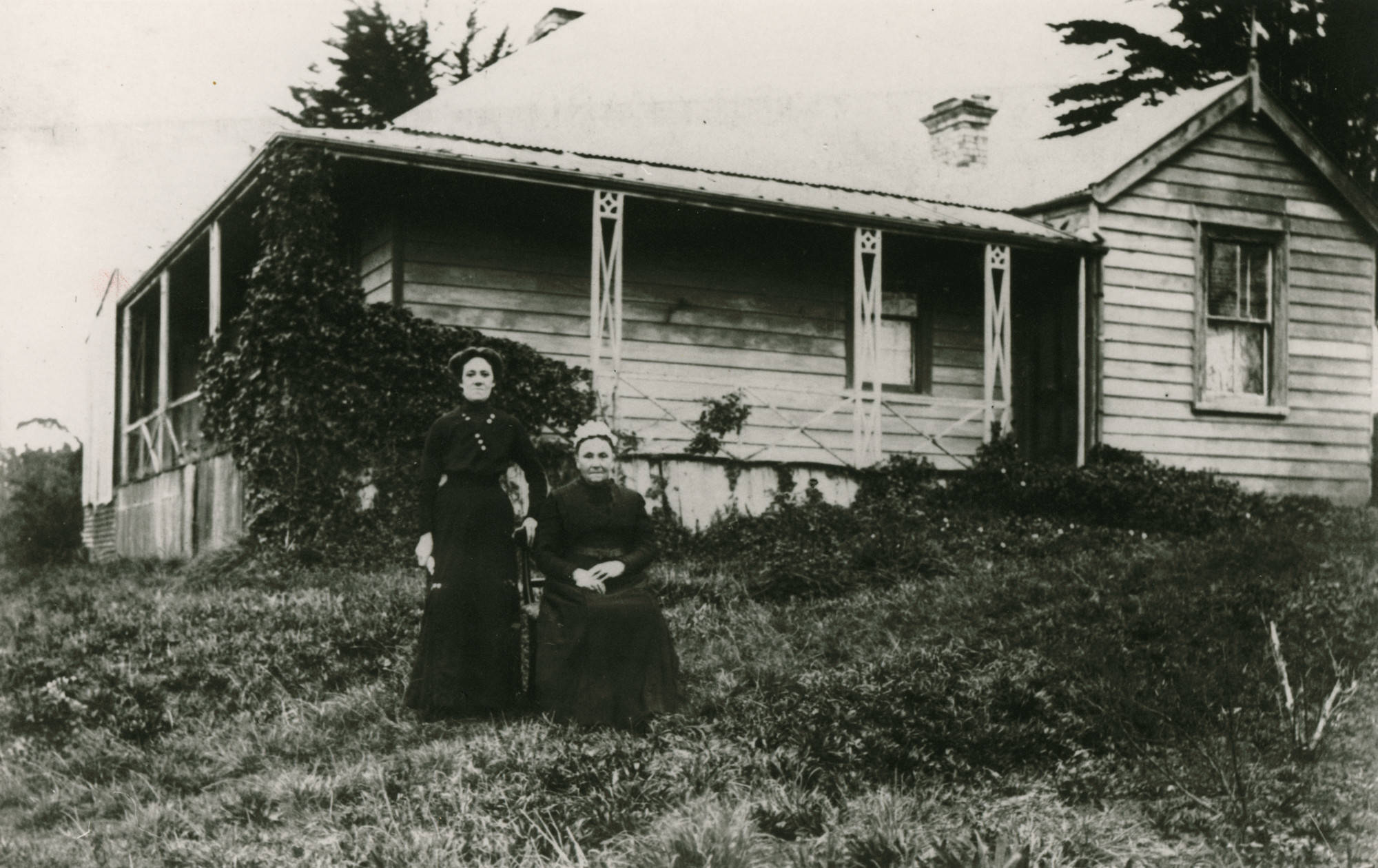
Scottish immigrant Elizabeth Wilson (right) and her daughter outside Betsland, an early farm house in the Hillcrest area (circa 1880s)

Tāmaki Māori settlement of the Auckland Region began around the 13th or 14th centuries. While poor clay soils of the inland forest of the North Shore hindered Māori settlement, inland areas were used for harvesting resources from the forests.

Hillcrest was a part of the Mahurangi Block, an area purchased by the Crown on 13 April 1841. Land speculators made purchases in the area in 1843. In 1867 Alexander Wilson, bought 100 acres (40 ha) of land near modern-day Moore Street, cultivating the land for fruit growing. Wilson called his farmhouse Betsland. Wilson was joined by Mr. Nicholson, who established a 128 acres (52 ha) property in western Northcote that he called Sunnybrae.

In 1942 during World War II, a camp was established at Hillcrest to house the First Auckland Battalion of the New Zealand Army, later becoming Camp Hillcrest, a base for the United States Army. The suburb began developing as a suburb of Auckland in the 1960s and 1970s, after the construction of the Auckland Harbour Bridge. Sunnybrae Normal School was opened in 1966 as a school to support teachers training at nearby North Shore Teachers College (now the site of AUT North Campus). This was followed by Willow Park School, established in 1967.

== Demographics ==
Hillcrest covers 2.93 km^{2} (1.13 sq mi) and had an estimated population of 11,570 as of June 2025, with a population density of 3,949 people per km^{2}.

Historical population
Year	Pop.	±% p.a.
2006	9,522	—
2013	9,819	+0.44%
2018	10,551	+1.45%
2023	10,635	+0.16%

Hillcrest (Auckland) had a population of 10,635 in the 2023 New Zealand census, an increase of 84 people (0.8%) since the 2018 census, and an increase of 816 people (8.3%) since the 2013 census. There were 5,250 males, 5,343 females and 39 people of other genders in 3,546 dwellings. 4.2% of people identified as LGBTIQ+. The median age was 36.3 years (compared with 38.1 years nationally). There were 1,824 people (17.2%) aged under 15 years, 2,286 (21.5%) aged 15 to 29, 5,172 (48.6%) aged 30 to 64, and 1,356 (12.8%) aged 65 or older.

People could identify as more than one ethnicity. The results were 52.2% European (Pākehā); 7.4% Māori; 3.5% Pasifika; 42.9% Asian; 2.9% Middle Eastern, Latin American and African New Zealanders (MELAA); and 1.7% other, which includes people giving their ethnicity as "New Zealander". English was spoken by 90.5%, Māori language by 1.2%, Samoan by 0.4%, and other languages by 37.3%. No language could be spoken by 2.3% (e.g. too young to talk). New Zealand Sign Language was known by 0.3%. The percentage of people born overseas was 48.7, compared with 28.8% nationally.

Religious affiliations were 29.4% Christian, 3.3% Hindu, 1.4% Islam, 0.2% Māori religious beliefs, 2.6% Buddhist, 0.2% New Age, 0.1% Jewish, and 1.5% other religions. People who answered that they had no religion were 56.4%, and 5.0% of people did not answer the census question.

Of those at least 15 years old, 3,591 (40.8%) people had a bachelor's or higher degree, 3,324 (37.7%) had a post-high school certificate or diploma, and 1,893 (21.5%) people exclusively held high school qualifications. The median income was $50,100, compared with $41,500 nationally. 1,425 people (16.2%) earned over $100,000 compared to 12.1% nationally. The employment status of those at least 15 was that 5,043 (57.2%) people were employed full-time, 1,116 (12.7%) were part-time, and 213 (2.4%) were unemployed.

Individual statistical areas
Name	Area (km^{2})	Population	Density (per km^{2})	Dwellings	Median age	Median income
Hillcrest North	0.98	3,465	3,536	1,155	36.8 years	$44,300
Hillcrest West	0.89	3,276	3,681	1,077	35.7 years	$53,200
Hillcrest East	1.06	3,900	3,679	1,314	36.3 years	$51,700
New Zealand					38.1 years	$41,500

== Education ==
Sunnybrae Normal School and Willow Park School are coeducational contributing primary (years 1–6) schools with rolls of 368 and 658 respectively, as of October 2025.

== Amenities ==
- Gurdwara Sahib North Shore, a Sikhism temple on Sunnybrae Road
- McFetridge Park, a suburban park on Archers Road which has cricket and football fields.
- Monarch Park
- Northcote Baptist Church. Beginning in 1949 in the home of Joseph and Sarah Thompson, the church was constructed in 1958. A new church complex was opened at the site on 5 August 1973.
- Stancich Reserve, a park which includes an area of kahikatea bush,

== Climate ==
Climate data for Hillcrest, North Shore (1991–2020)
Month	Jan	Feb	Mar	Apr	May	Jun	Jul	Aug	Sep	Oct	Nov	Dec	Year
Mean daily maximum °C (°F)	23.7 (74.7)	24.1 (75.4)	22.7 (72.9)	20.6 (69.1)	18.3 (64.9)	16.2 (61.2)	15.3 (59.5)	15.6 (60.1)	16.8 (62.2)	18.4 (65.1)	20.0 (68.0)	22.0 (71.6)	19.5 (67.1)
Daily mean °C (°F)	20.1 (68.2)	20.6 (69.1)	19.1 (66.4)	16.9 (62.4)	14.8 (58.6)	12.7 (54.9)	11.7 (53.1)	12.1 (53.8)	13.2 (55.8)	14.6 (58.3)	16.3 (61.3)	18.4 (65.1)	15.9 (60.6)
Mean daily minimum °C (°F)	16.5 (61.7)	17.0 (62.6)	15.5 (59.9)	13.3 (55.9)	11.3 (52.3)	9.3 (48.7)	8.0 (46.4)	8.6 (47.5)	9.7 (49.5)	10.9 (51.6)	12.6 (54.7)	14.9 (58.8)	12.3 (54.1)
Source: NIWA

== Bibliography ==
- Rounthwaite, Valerie (1989), The Story of Rural Glenfield, Takapuna: Takapuna City Council, OCLC 37482407, Wikidata Q123499466
- McClure, Margaret (1987). The Story of Birkenhead. Birkenhead City Council. ISBN 0-908704-04-6. OL 33998949W. Wikidata Q120679112.
- Verran, David (2010), The North Shore: An Illustrated History, North Shore: Random House, OL 33434370W, Wikidata Q120520385
