= Birkdale, New Zealand =

Suburb of Auckland

Birkdale
- Suburb
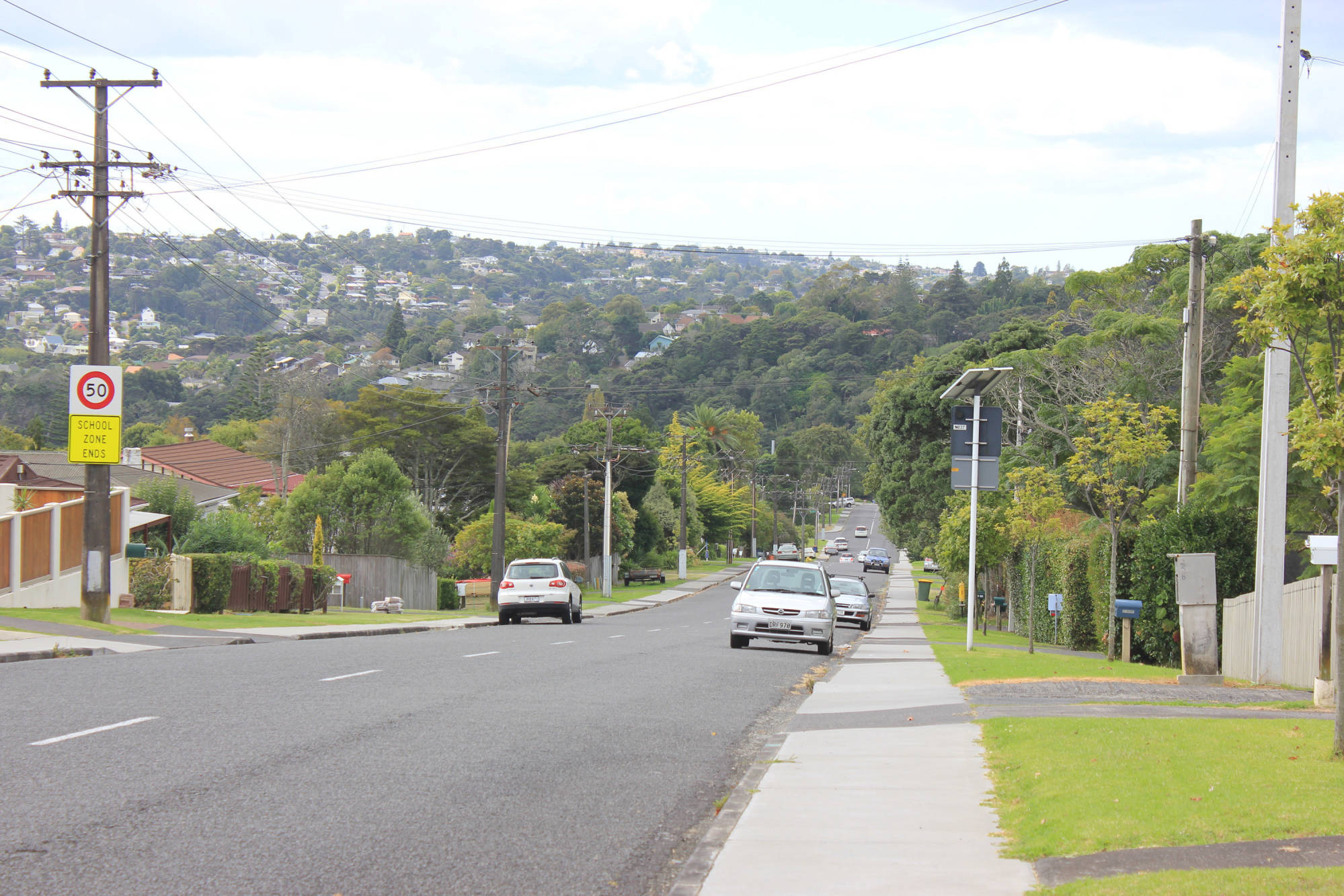
- Looking north from Salisbury Road, Birkdale
- Interactive map of Birkdale
- Coordinates: 36.8006°S 174.7042°E
- Country: New Zealand
- City: Auckland
- Local authority: Auckland Council
- Electoral ward: North Shore Ward
- Local board: Kaipātiki Local Board

Area
  - Land: 290 ha (720 acres)

Population (June 2025)
  - Total: 9,750
  - Density: 3,400/km^{2} (8,700/sq mi)
- Postcode: 0626

Beach Haven	Beach Haven	Glenfield
(Waitematā Harbour)	Birkdale	Birkenhead
(Waitematā Harbour)	Chatswood	Birkenhead

Birkdale is a suburb of the contiguous Auckland metropolitan area located in New Zealand. Originally called Parkview, comprising the area from Balmain Rd to the Birkdale (now Beach Haven) wharf, it was renamed Birkdale at a meeting of the Birkenhead Borough Council in 1889, after the suburb of Birkenhead in England of the same name. It now comprises statistical area units such as 'Birkdale North' and 'Birkdale South'. The suburb is located in the North Shore area, to the Northwest of Birkenhead, and is under the governance of Auckland Council.

== Demographics ==
Birkdale covers 2.90 km^{2} (1.12 sq mi) and had an estimated population of 9,750 as of June 2025, with a population density of 3,362 people per km^{2}.

Historical population
Year	Pop.	±% p.a.
2006	7,896	—
2013	8,616	+1.25%
2018	9,195	+1.31%
2023	9,204	+0.02%
The 2006 population is for a smaller area of 2.80 km^{2} Source:

Birkdale had a population of 9,204 in the 2023 New Zealand census, an increase of 9 people (0.1%) since the 2018 census, and an increase of 588 people (6.8%) since the 2013 census. There were 4,521 males, 4,653 females and 30 people of other genders in 3,105 dwellings. 3.9% of people identified as LGBTIQ+. The median age was 34.6 years (compared with 38.1 years nationally). There were 1,929 people (21.0%) aged under 15 years, 1,857 (20.2%) aged 15 to 29, 4,518 (49.1%) aged 30 to 64, and 897 (9.7%) aged 65 or older.

People could identify as more than one ethnicity. The results were 63.3% European (Pākehā); 14.0% Māori; 10.3% Pasifika; 23.7% Asian; 4.3% Middle Eastern, Latin American and African New Zealanders (MELAA); and 2.7% other, which includes people giving their ethnicity as "New Zealander". English was spoken by 94.2%, Māori language by 3.4%, Samoan by 1.5%, and other languages by 24.8%. No language could be spoken by 3.2% (e.g. too young to talk). New Zealand Sign Language was known by 0.3%. The percentage of people born overseas was 38.7, compared with 28.8% nationally.

Religious affiliations were 32.3% Christian, 2.8% Hindu, 2.1% Islam, 0.6% Māori religious beliefs, 1.4% Buddhist, 0.4% New Age, 0.1% Jewish, and 1.6% other religions. People who answered that they had no religion were 52.7%, and 6.1% of people did not answer the census question.

Of those at least 15 years old, 2,502 (34.4%) people had a bachelor's or higher degree, 3,138 (43.1%) had a post-high school certificate or diploma, and 1,629 (22.4%) people exclusively held high school qualifications. The median income was $51,800, compared with $41,500 nationally. 1,167 people (16.0%) earned over $100,000 compared to 12.1% nationally. The employment status of those at least 15 was that 4,440 (61.0%) people were employed full-time, 861 (11.8%) were part-time, and 192 (2.6%) were unemployed.

Individual statistical areas
Name	Area (km^{2})	Population	Density (per km^{2})	Dwellings	Median age	Median income
Birkdale North	0.75	2,514	3,352	807	34.4 years	$44,700
Birkdale Central	0.99	3,030	3,061	1,047	34.1 years	$53,400
Birkdale South	1.16	3,660	3,155	1,251	35.2 years	$54,800
New Zealand					38.1 years	$41,500

== Education ==
Birkenhead College is a secondary (Years 9–13) school with a roll of 475 students. The school began as Birkdale College, opening in 1972. The name change was made in 1988.

Birkdale Intermediate opened in 1965 and is an intermediate (years 7–8) school with a roll of 233. Contributing local primary schools are Beach Haven, Birkdale, Birkdale North, Kauri Park and Verran.

Birkdale North School (opened 1965) and Birkdale Primary School are primary (years 1–6) schools with rolls of 142 and 195, respectively.

Birkdale Primary was established in 1894.

Kauri Park School (opened 1969) was originally called Birkdale West School. Verran Primary was first mooted as Birkdale East School.

All of these schools are coeducational. All rolls are as of July 2026.
