= Chelsea Sugar Refinery =

Sugar refinery in Auckland, New Zealand

Chelsea Sugar

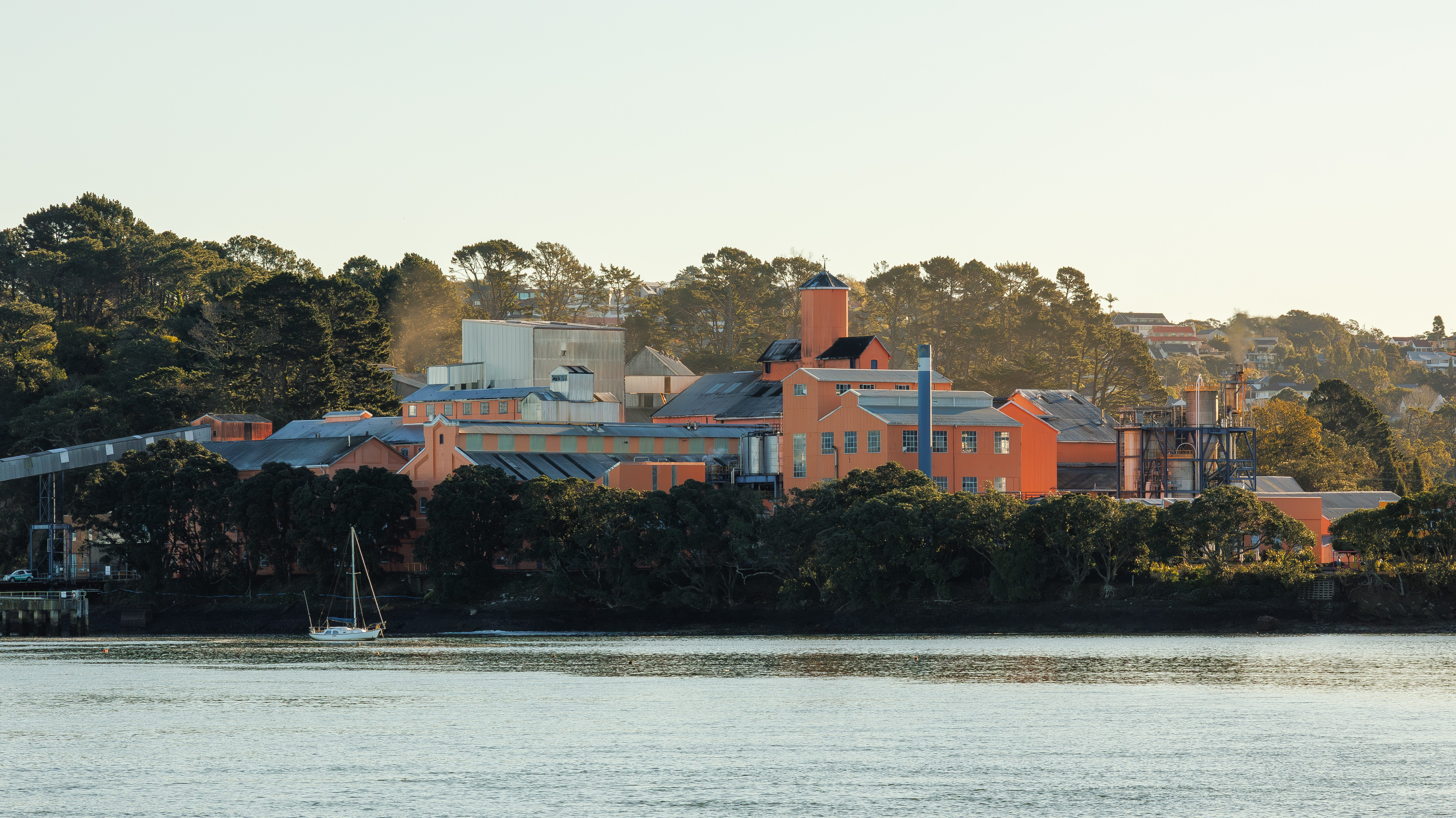
- Chelsea Sugar, as seen from Birkenhead Wharf

General information
- Coordinates: 36.821°S 174.724°E
- Completed: 1884; 142 years ago

Heritage New Zealand – Category 1
- Designated: 26 June 2009; 17 years ago
- Reference no.: 7792

New Zealand Sugar Company Limited is a long-established business and landmark in Birkenhead, New Zealand, located on the northern shore of Auckland's Waitematā Harbour. The company is also known colloquially as "Chelsea Sugar", taking reference from the company's branded sugar "Chelsea", and the site is also colloquially known as the "Chelsea Sugar Refinery".

The refinery was established in 1884, and remains New Zealand's main source of sugar products (for both home use and for the food and beverage industry). This position remained even after New Zealand's deregulation opened the markets in the 1980s to foreign competition, and products are also exported overseas. The refinery also has one of Auckland's deepwater ports, with handysize ships importing raw sugar globally every six weeks.

== History ==
Throughout most of the 19th century, all sugar products in New Zealand had to be imported; wishing to improve New Zealand's self-sufficiency, in 1882 the government offered a bounty to the first company to produce sugar locally. Already interested in business prospects in New Zealand, the Australian Colonial Sugar Refining Company had investigated possible sites in New Zealand and purchased 160 acres (65 ha) of farm land in Birkenhead. This was later expanded to 450 acres (1.8 km^{2}).

The site was ideal for a refinery: the Waitemata offered deep water close to shore for a port, and fresh water from Duck Creek, which ran through the estate, and land and timber for building purposes were plentiful.

The name "Chelsea" was bestowed on the site by the refinery's first customs officer, who named it after Chelsea in England, his hometown.

=== New Zealand Sugar Company established ===
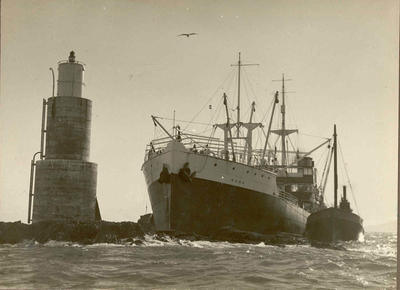
Chelsea Sugar Co's vessel Rona, aground on Flat Rock, near Kawau Island, June 1922

The "New Zealand Sugar Company" was formed in June 1883 by the Colonial Sugar Refining Company, the Victorian Sugar Company, and a number of prominent Auckland businessmen, including Sir Frederick Whitaker, Allan Kerr Taylor, LD Nathan (of Lion Nathan), and AG Horton and JL Wilson (of Wilson & Horton). However, a collapse in the world sugar market in the 1880s led the New Zealand Sugar Company to be re-amalgamated into its parent company Colonial Sugar in 1888. In 1959, the present New Zealand Sugar Company was formed to allow local autonomy. Wilmar International currently own 75% of the New Zealand Sugar Company, and Mackay Sugar own 25%.

=== New refinery ===
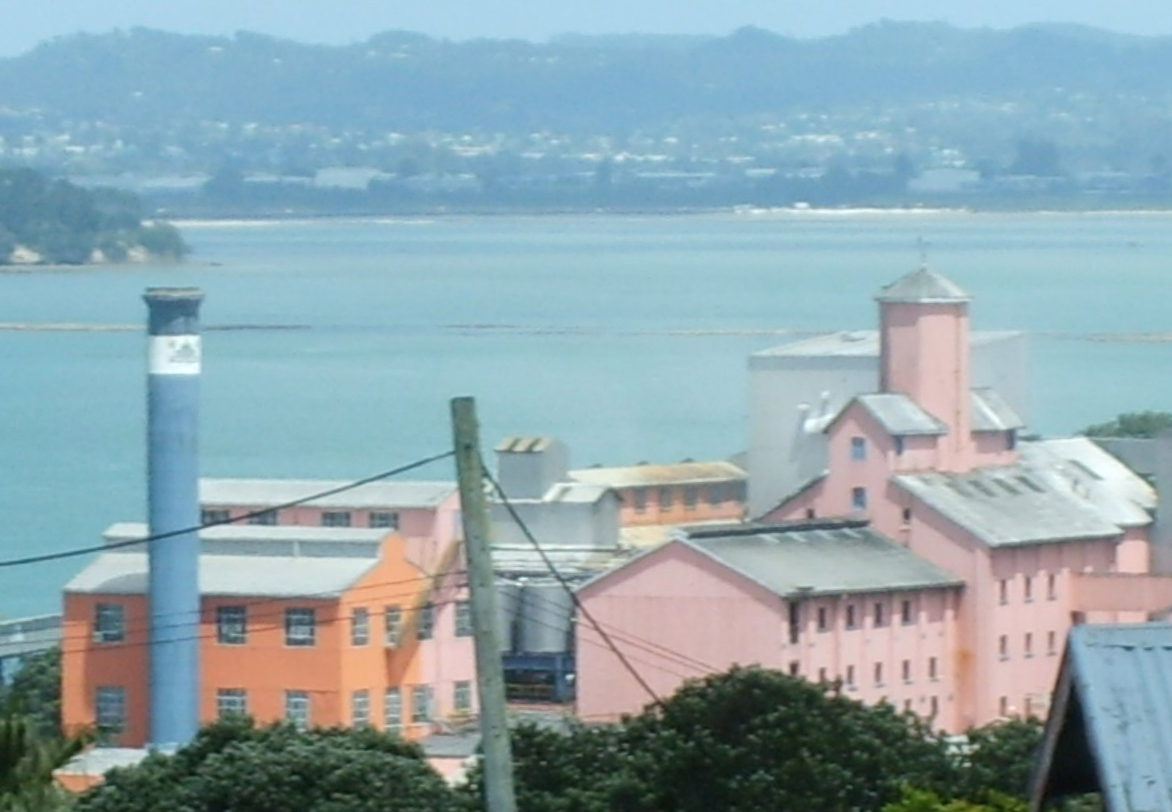
The original 1884 building, seen here on the right, is still used today, and forms the basis for the company logo.

Work began on the new refinery in 1883, when 150 workers levelled the ground, reclaimed a natural lagoon, built wharves (by blasting bedrock), and created dams using two-thirds of the 1.5 million bricks which were made on site; the remainder were used in the buildings. By 1884, the refinery was operating, and has not ceased its 24-hour operation since.

Of the 150 workers who built the refinery, 100 remained to work in it once it was complete; most had migrated from Auckland and settled in the area.

Some of the early machinery and equipment was imported from Greenock in Scotland; much of this historic equipment remains on site, providing a rich industrial heritage.

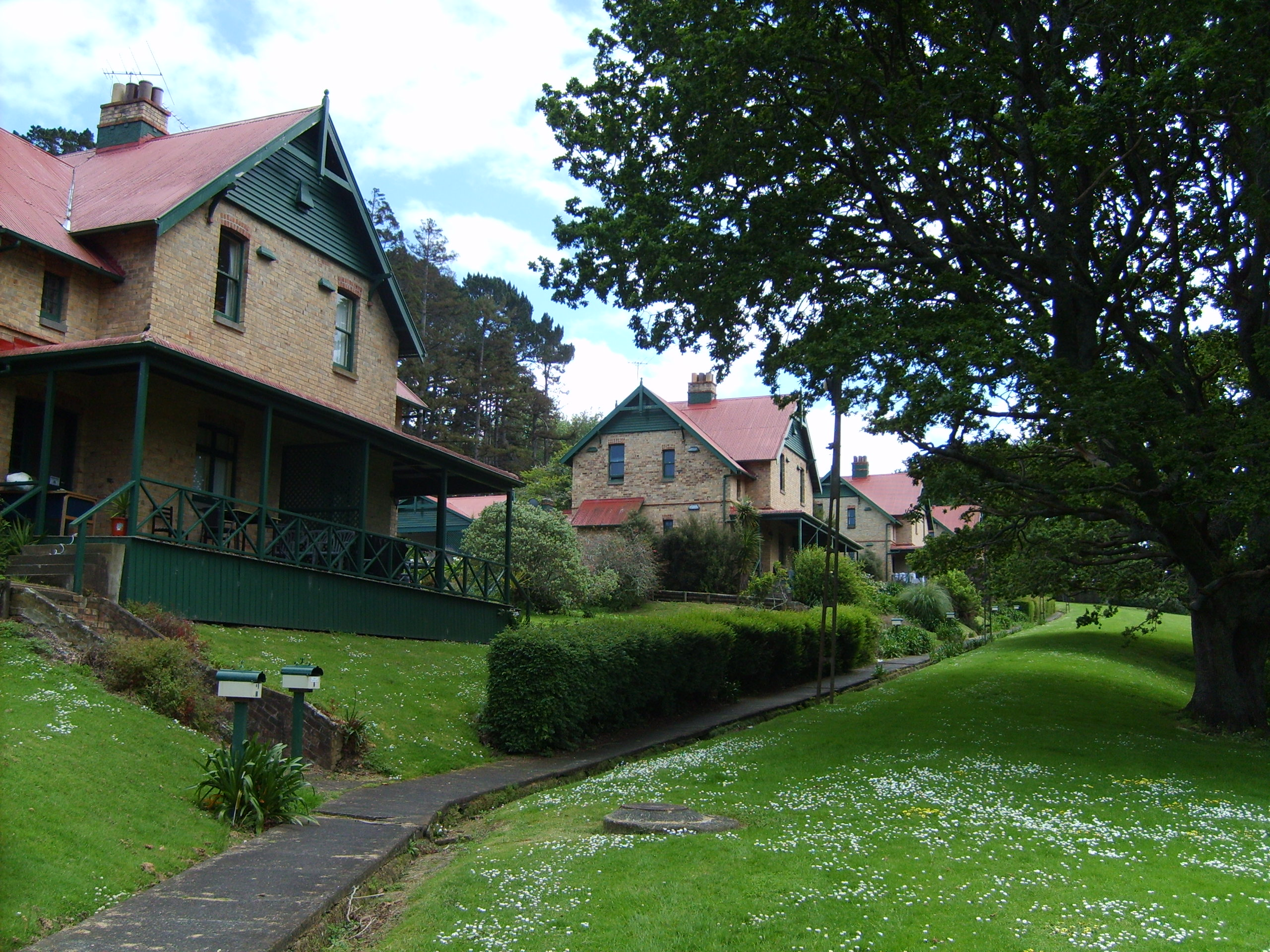
Built in 1909, the row of brick workers' cottages are little changed today.

=== Model village ===
As work on the refinery began, the managers and company officers were able to adapt the existing farm cottages on the estate for their use, but the majority of workers lived in tents and temporary dwellings near the building site. This shanty town was replaced by Chelsea Village, which consisted of 35 cottages provided by the company within the grounds, some distance from the existing Birkenhead village. Planned to be a model town, it provided gardens, a church, reading room, school, and shop.

However, the village did not remain for many years; the lower houses suffered from dampness and were unoccupied by the early 1890s, and by 1900 it was known as the "barracks" and occupied mainly by single men. In 1905, the village was condemned by the health authorities and the worst of the houses were demolished; the rest were sold and shifted from the site. Some of the relocated cottages can still be seen in the older streets around Birkenhead, and the church, now known as St Peters, was moved to Verrans Corner (a local suburb).

Desiring its core tradesmen to remain on site, in case of emergencies, the company built four semi-detached brick houses in 1909 on the site of the old Chelsea Village. These houses remain in Chelsea's ownership, but are now rented to private individuals. For the remaining workers, the company offered inexpensive housing loans, which financed the building of over a third of Birkenhead's new houses between 1910 and 1926, mainly in the streets surrounding the refinery, including Colonial Road (named after the original sugar company) and Huka Road (after the Māori name for sugar).

=== Sugar workers ===
The poet James K Baxter worked at Chelsea as a cleaner in 1969—a job found for him by Hone Tuwhare. Dismissed after three weeks, he wrote the satirical poem "Ballad of the Stonegut Sugar Works" which expressed his unhappiness at the working conditions. Baxter's impression of the factory was not shared by all workers; it was recognised as a place of hard work, but the community spirit was high and the company provided many benefits for workers. The company housing loans and secure employment ensured long service, often complete generations from the same families all working at the refinery.

In the 2000s, about 240 people were occupied at the refinery.

== Wider impact ==
=== Development of Birkenhead ===
Before the opening of Auckland's Harbour Bridge in 1959, access to the North Shore from the city was restricted to transport by ferry. While some residents commuted to the city, most of the development of the area was determined by local employment; thus, Chelsea was a leading proponent and determinant in the growth of Birkenhead and provided a focal point for the community. With Chelsea as the major employer, Birkenhead was considered by many to be a company town. In 1900, when the borough's population was 1000, one-third of the men worked at the refinery; local farmers and orchardists relied on casual labour in their off-season.

The bridge opening also meant that Auckland’s North Shore was now a convenient place to live, so Chelsea sold more than 100 hectares of land for subdivision. This is the suburb now known as Chatswood and includes the Chelsea Sugar Refinery.

Before the establishment of the sugar works, the area consisted of farms and orchards, with a small village beside Birkenhead Wharf; within four years of the refinery's opening, Birkenhead had become a borough. The burgeoning town grew up the hill towards Chelsea Village, with a group of shops established at Highbury, between the two original villages. Most of the local shops were supported by business from Chelsea and its workers, and workers became involved in local community affairs, including the offices of mayor and councillor. The shift sirens could be heard throughout Birkenhead and served as a 'clock' for all.

=== Second port on the Waitematā ===
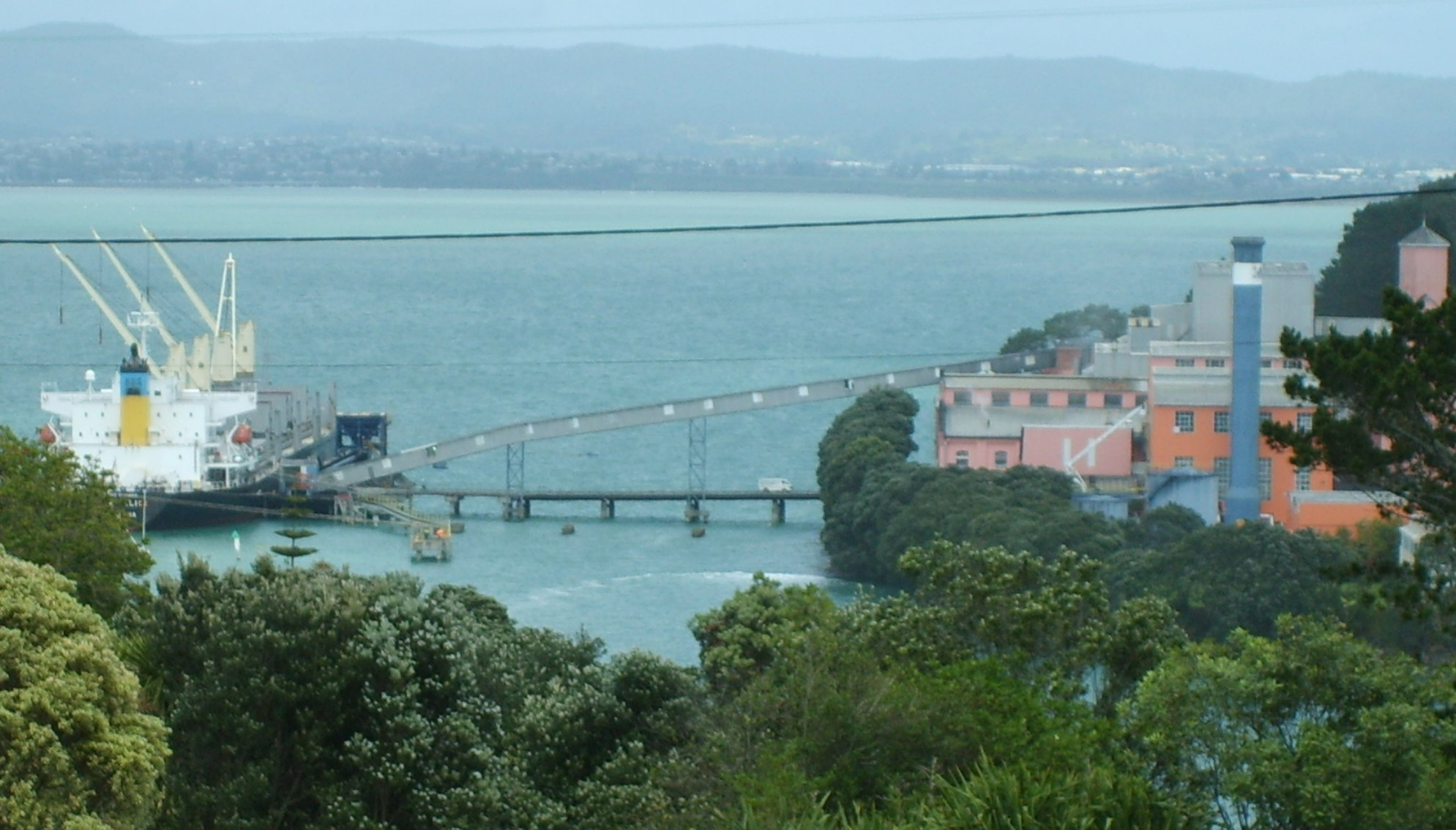
The bulk carrier Port Alice docked at Chelsea Wharf for unloading

The site was chosen due to the deepwater access, allowing a port to be built in 1884. Raw sugar came from Fiji, Cuba, Australia, Indonesia, and Peru for refining, and until the building of the Auckland Harbour Bridge, the finished products were shipped out from the wharf. All other commodities, such as coal, food, and mail, were also handled by Chelsea Wharf.

This port continues to accept ships, generally handysize bulk carriers, delivering up to 30,000 tons of raw sugar. It remains private, but arrivals at the port are recorded by the Ports of Auckland and subject to Customs and MAF regulations. As the ships generally exceed 500 gross register tons (GRT), the ships require pilotage, managed by the Ports of Auckland's Harbour Control.

Some of the land was in the ownership of the Ports of Auckland, and leased to Chelsea. In 1997, approval was granted for Chelsea to purchase the land, a total of nine hectares.

The port is located up-harbour from the Harbour Bridge, thus enforcing a large central span (243.8 m) and height (43.27 m at high tide).

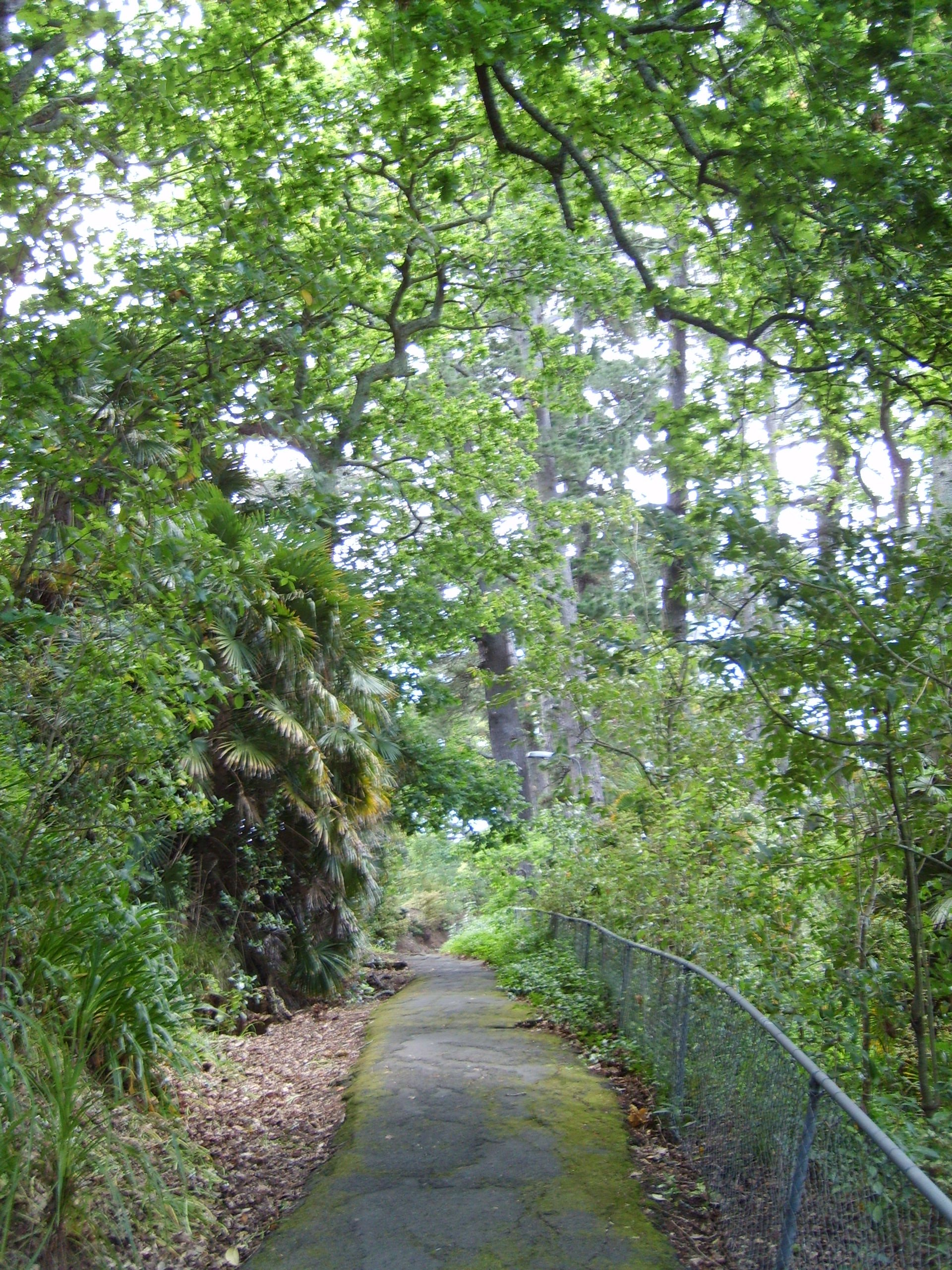
One of the footpaths leading through the grounds

=== Architectural and cultural impact ===
Chelsea is more than a landmark on the coast; it has been central to the development of the local community and remains active in preserving and encouraging interest in the local heritage and local events, sponsoring things as diverse as school trails and the publication of local histories.

As part of the company's interest in preserving its early heritage for later generations, it has entrusted its archives to the Birkenhead Public Library. These Chelsea Archives contain company records, including wage books, legal files, and share registers from throughout its history.

The architectural and social importance of the site is recognised by Heritage New Zealand. The early factory buildings, manager's house, and brick houses have Category II listings, and the site as a whole is recognised for its industrial heritage. As one of the largest complexes in New Zealand, and one of the few refineries in the South Pacific, it helped to established New Zealand as an economic force.

Throughout its history, Chelsea has allowed the public open access to its significant grounds, which comprise wetlands, lakes, open space, and bush. To ensure the parkland—and its access—is maintained, has become a public legacy.

Among the other cultural impacts which the refinery has had on its surrounds is the origin of top local association football team Glenfield Rovers. The club, founded as Chelsea F.C. in 1960, was originally a social club for staff at the refinery. It later became more than just a social side, and has among the strongest teams in the Auckland region since the mid-1990s. The club reached the semifinals of the national Chatham Cup competition in 2008.

== In modern times ==
The current Golden Syrup tin displays an illustration of the 19th-century refinery, a design reflected in the company logo shown on the White Sugar packaging.

Chelsea operates 24 hours a day, 5 days per week, and remains New Zealand's market leader in sugar products. Chelsea purchases bulk raw sugar globally, which is brought in by ship and processed and packaged at the refinery. Sales offices and warehouses around the country aid in the distribution of 200,000 tonnes of sugar a year, supplying both retail and manufacturing markets. About 20% of Chelsea's total production is exported, mainly to Australia and the Pacific. New Zealand has a deregulated economy; hence it has no subsidies or import tariffs for sugar, so Chelsea operates entirely within the free market.

Chelsea provide financial support and sponsorship for a variety of organisations and projects within the local community. They also provide funding for the Sugar Research Advisory Service, an independent organisation undertaking and reviewing research into sugar.
