= Birkenhead, New Zealand =

Birkenhead
- Suburb
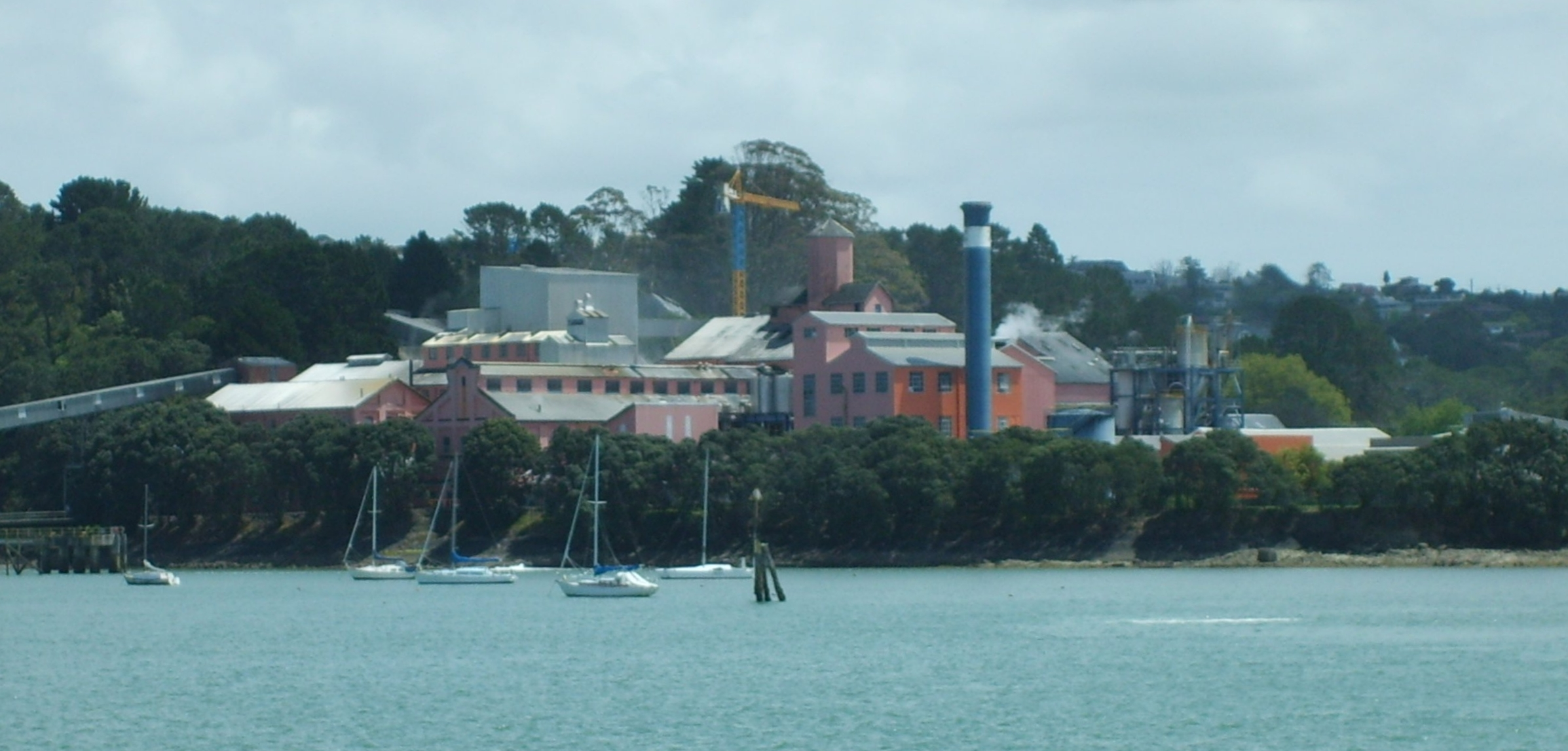
- The sugar refinery, a local landmark.
- Interactive map of Birkenhead
- Coordinates: 36.807490°S 174.723051°E
- Country: New Zealand
- City: Auckland
- Local authority: Auckland Council
- Electoral ward: North Shore ward
- Local board: Kaipātiki Local Board
- Established: 1883 (Approx.)

Area
  - Land: 452 ha (1,120 acres)

Population (June 2025)
  - Total: 10,730
  - Density: 2,370/km^{2} (6,150/sq mi)
- Postcode: 0626
- Ferry terminals: Birkenhead Ferry Terminal

Birkdale	Glenfield	Hillcrest
Birkdale	Birkenhead	Northcote
Chatswood	(Waitematā Harbour)	(Waitematā Harbour)

Birkenhead is a suburb of Auckland, in northern New Zealand. It is located on the North Shore of the Waitematā Harbour, 4 kilometres (2.5 mi) northwest of the Auckland City Centre. The area has been settled by Tāmaki Māori since at least the 14th century, and was the location of Te Matarae ō Mana, a fortified pā for Te Kawerau ā Maki that overlooked an important seasonal shark fishery. European settlement in Birkenhead began in late the 1840s, and by the late 19th century the area became renowned for strawberry crops. In 1884, the Chelsea Sugar Refinery was constructed in Birkenhead, becoming a major source of income for Birkenhead. The increased population growth led to Birkenhead becoming one of the first boroughs of Auckland in 1888. Birkenhead transitioned from a semi-rural community to suburban Auckland after the opening of the Auckland Harbour Bridge in 1959, becoming a city in 1978. In 1989, Birkenhead City was amalgamated with North Shore City.

== Etymology ==
The name Birkenhead first appears in relation to a land survey conducted by Charles Heaphy in the summer of 1862 and 1863. The origin is unknown, but it possibly stems from the geographical similarities the area has to Birkenhead in North West England, which is on the opposite shore of the River Mersey to Liverpool. Similar locations can be found in Adelaide and Sydney in Australia. A common story explaining the origins of the suburb's name involves land developer Samuel Cochrane choosing the name in memory of his hometown, but this story appears to be apocryphal, as Cochrane was a Londoner and did not have ties to Liverpool. The first mentions in press of Birkenhead were real estate advertisements placed by Samuel Cochrane in June 1863.

== Geography ==
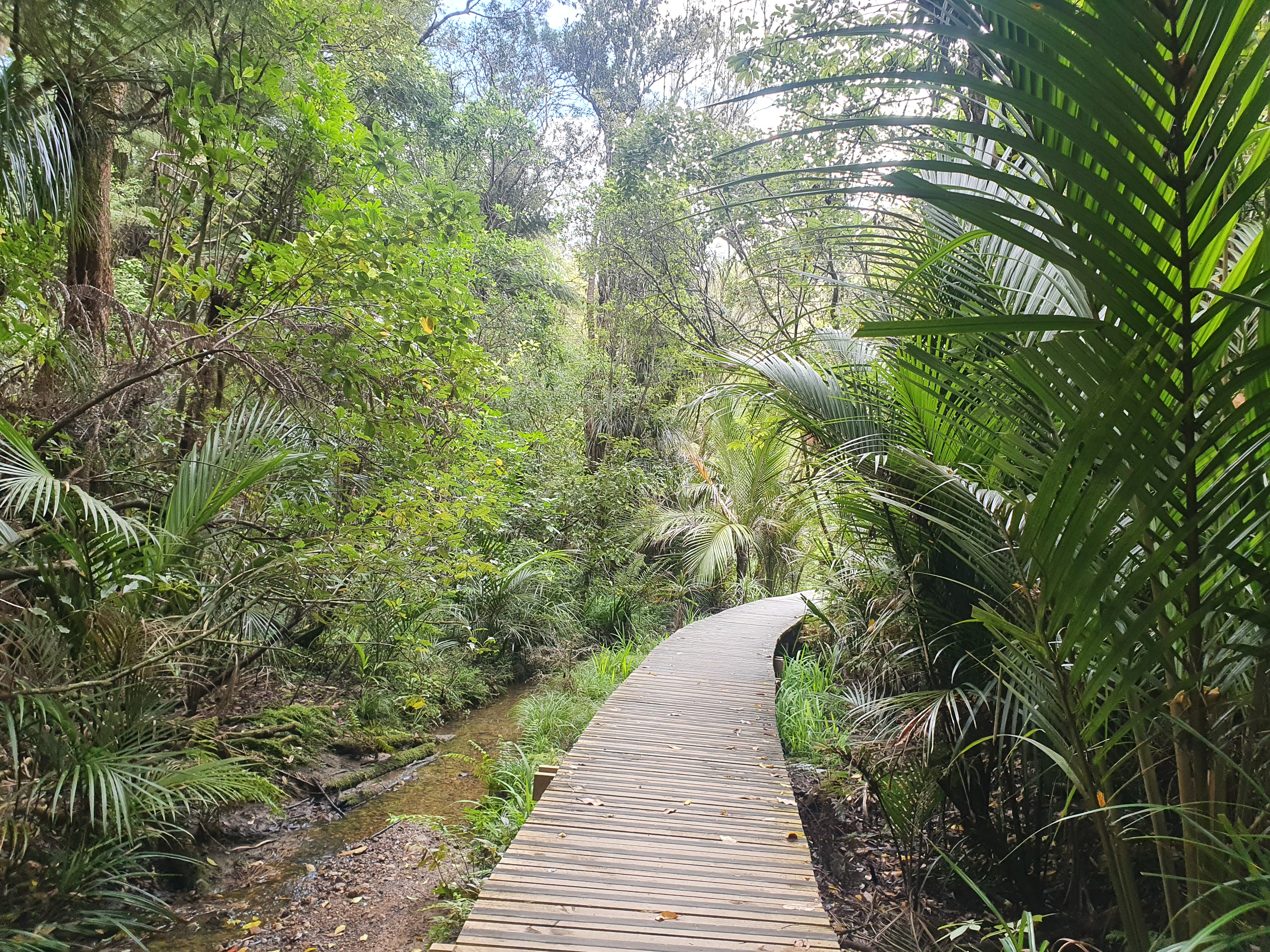
Le Roys Bush is an area of remnant forest in Birkenhead

The Birkenhead area is primarily uplifted Waitemata Group sandstone, that was deposited on the sea floor during the Early Miocene, between 22 and 16 million years ago. Prior to human settlement, the inland North Shore was a mixed podocarp-broadleaf forest dominated by kauri. Pōhutukawa trees dominated the coastal margins of Birkenhead. Some kauri remnant forest remains in areas around Birkenhead, including Kauri Park, Le Roys Bush, Kauri Point Domain, Kauri Glen and Eskdale Reserve.

Highbury is a suburb located within Birkenhead, which refers to the older shopping centre at the junction of Birkenhead Avenue and Mokoia Road. The name Highbury was the name of Thomas Forgham's family residence, that was constructed in early colonial Birkenhead. The name of the house was chosen by English immigrant William Francis Hammond, Forgham's son-in-law, in memory of Highbury, Hammond's parents' townhouse in Highgate, London.

The highest point in the suburb is the hill in eastern Eskdale Reserve, which reaches a height of 98 metres (322 ft) above sea-level in the neighbouring suburb of Hillcrest.

== History ==
=== Māori history ===
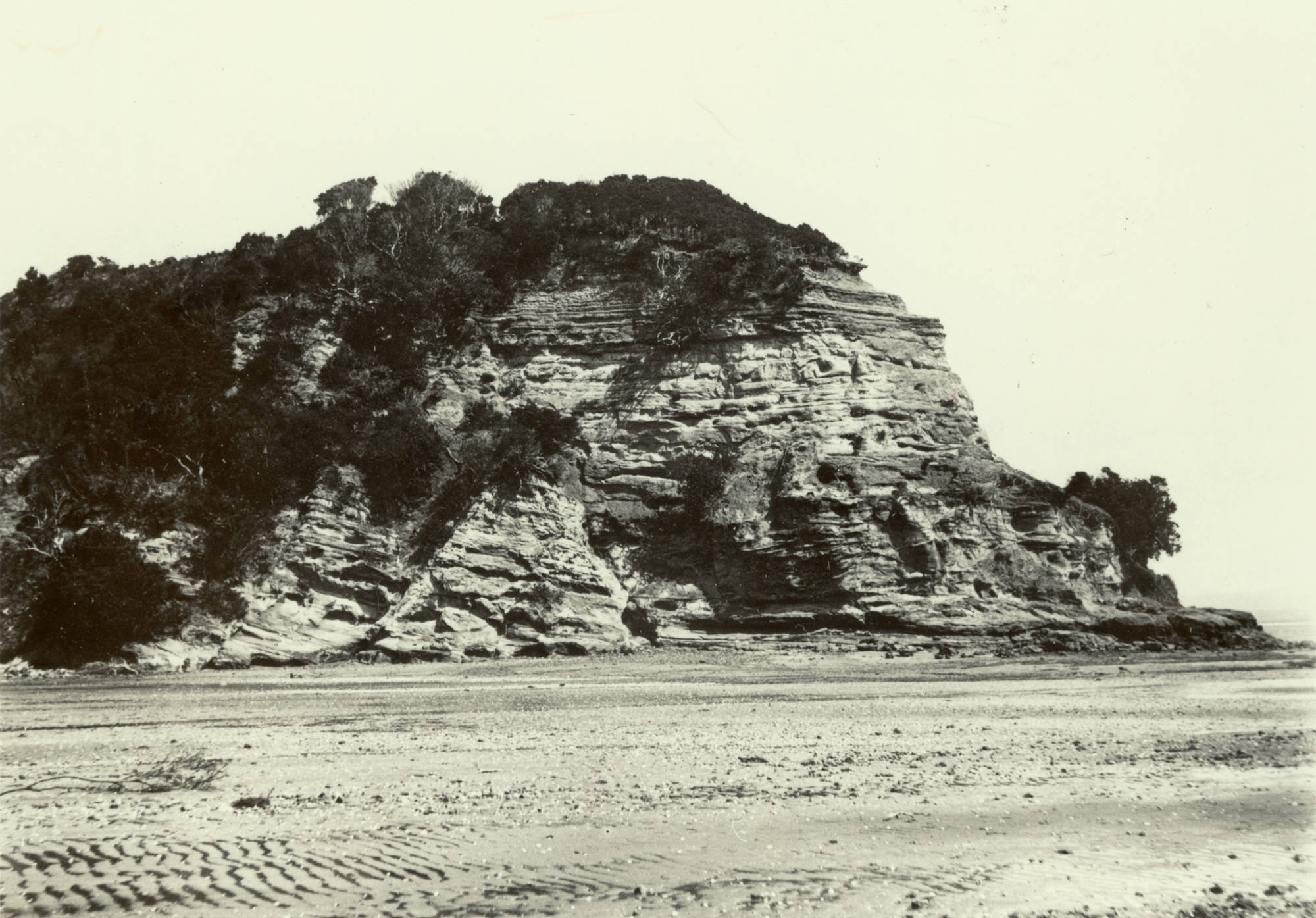
Kauri Point was the location of Te Mātārae ō Mana ("The Brow of Mana"), a Te Kawerau ā Maki pā overlooking the Waitematā Harbour and close to an important shark fishery

Māori settlement of the Auckland Region began around the 13th or 14th centuries. The North Shore was settled by Tāmaki Māori, including people descended from the Tainui migratory canoe and ancestors of figures such as Taikehu and Peretū. Many of the early Tāmaki Māori people of the North Shore identified as Ngā Oho.

Boat Rock (Te Nihokiore, "The Rat's Tooth") in the Waitematā Harbour southwest of Birkenhead was a location of great significance to Tāmaki Māori. The rock was the location where Te Arawa chief Kahumatamomoe placed a mauri stone (a stone of religious significance), naming the Waitematā ("The Waters of the Stone") after the mauri stone.

The warrior Maki migrated from the Kāwhia Harbour to his ancestral home in the Auckland Region, likely sometime in the 17th century. Maki conquered and unified many the Tāmaki Māori tribes as Te Kawerau ā Maki, including those of the North Shore. After Maki's death, his sons settled different areas of his lands, creating new hapū. His younger son Maraeariki settled the North Shore and Hibiscus Coast, who based himself at the head of the Ōrewa River. Maraeariki's daughter Kahu succeeded him, and she is the namesake of the North Shore, Te Whenua Roa o Kahu ("The Greater Lands of Kahu"). Many of the iwi of the North Shore, including Ngāti Manuhiri, Ngāti Maraeariki, Ngāti Kahu, Ngāti Poataniwha, Ngāi Tai ki Tāmaki and Ngāti Whātua, can trace their lineage to Kahu.

The poor clay soils of the inland forest of the hindered development. Most Māori settlements of the Birkenhead area focused on fishing and harvesting food from the forests. The focal point of Te Kawerau ā Maki on the North Shore was Te Mātārae ō Mana ("The Brow of Mana"), a headland pā at Kauri Point in modern-day Chatswood, and Rongohau ("Wind Shelter"), the kāinga below the cliffs at Kendall Bay. Te Mātārae ō Mana was named after the ancestor Manaoterangi, who was the rangatira of the pā in the mid-18th century, and was likely constructed in the 17th century. The pā was of strategic importance due to its commanding view of the Waitematā Harbour, and its proximity to a renowned tauranga mango, a shark fishery which brought seasonal visitors from across Tāmaki Makurau and the Hauraki Gulf in the summer, including important rangatira such as Kiwi Tāmaki and later Tarahawaiki.

Manaoterangi was a close relative of Tuperiri of the Te Taoū/Ngāti Whātua ragatira Tuperiri, and was married to Waikahuia, the sister of Waiohua paramount chief Kiwi Tāmaki. Because of this, the pā and Mana's people were spared during the conflicts between Te Taoū and Waiohua in the mid-18th century, and at the end of his life, Manaoterangi entrusted his people to Tuperiri and the iwi that grew to become Ngāti Whātua Ōrākei.

By the early 19th century, the eastern headlands the Upper Waitematā Harbour, including along Oruamo or Hellyers Creek were some of the most densely settled areas of the North Shore by Tāmaki Māori. Oruamo or Hellyers Creek was an important transportation node for the North Shore area.

In the latter 18th and early 19th centuries, members of Te Taoū/Ngāti Whātua Ōrākei resided seasonally at Te Mātārae a Mana. During the early 1820s, most Māori of the North Shore fled for the Waikato or Northland due to the threat of war parties during the Musket Wars. Te Mātārae ō Mana and Rongohau were raided and destroyed in a night raid around the year 1823.

When Tāmaki Māori returned in greater numbers to the Auckland Region, Te Mātārae ō Mana and Rongohau were occupied again, until the early 1840s. The shark fishery remained an important location for many decades onwards. In 1844, when Tāmaki Māori held the feast of Remuera, sharks were caught for the event at this fishery, and considerable numbers of Māori fishing boats fished the area as late as the 1860s.

Outside of Te Mātārae ō Mana and Rongohau, other known locations of significance to Tāmaki Māori around Birkenhead include Maunganui or Mangonui was the name of a pā located inland on the Kauri Point ridge, and Ngutuwera, an inland pā where people would stay seasonally, to snare kākā in the wooded vallies of Tāwhiwhikareao. The traditional names for the bays of the area include Wararoa (Chelsea), Onetaunga (Onetaunga and Soldiers Bay), Wa Iti o Toroa (Island Bay), Kaiwhanake (Charcoal Bay) and Opaketai (the bay north of Charcoal Bay).

=== Early European settlement ===
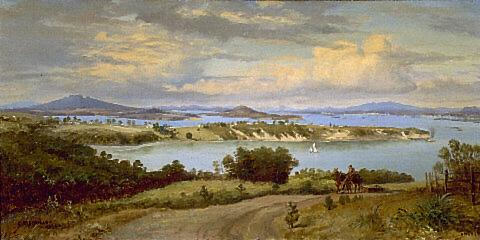
Our Harbour from Birkenhead (1884), an oil painting by Charles Blomfield

Birkenhead was a part of the Mahurangi Block, an area purchased by the Crown on 13 April 1841. Land speculators purchased much of the isolated forests of Birkenhead in 1843, and the first permanent settlers arrived in 1849.

Major Collings Ann de Jersey Grut emigrated to New Zealand in the 1850s from the Channel Islands, alongside her husband Major Collings de Jersey Grut and brother Charles D'Auvergne. The de Jersey Grut family established a farm and manor near Duck Creek in the 1850s, but struggled to establish a farm. The poor soil led to starvation, and the servants needing to share food with the de Jersey Grut family members, and cattle would often wander off into the bush. The de Jersey Grut family left in 1865, and had their house shipped to Orewa.

Henry James Hawkins, established a fruit orchard in the Birkenhead area in the 1850s. Despite the poor clay soil, Hawkins became a famed horticulturalist, winning prizes for crops such as apples, plums, peas, gooseberries, strawberries. Fruit became a major industry for Birkenhead from the 1860s, notably apples, pears, and two varieties of strawberry, Marguerite and Duke of Edinburgh, which flourished well in clay soils.

Birkenhead was subdivided and promoted as a township from 1863, alongside other settlements such as Allandale and Balmain (neither of which eventuated). Residents of the village survived through subsistence farming, and profited from bountiful seasonal strawberry crops.

In 1879, William Francis Hammond bought 30 acres (12 ha) at Birkenhead Point, establishing Raven Hill estate, followed by Charles E. Button who established a second grand house at Birkenhead Point in 1883. Hammond, the son of a London auctioneer, was a keen promoter of Birkenhead, surveying the area and promoting Birkenhead subdivisions and estates at auctions, and constructing a bridge across Little Shoal Bay, better connecting the community to Northcote.

Lake Road, connecting Northcote and Birkenhead, was significantly improved in the 1870s, helping development in Birkenhead. This was aided further by the Auckland Harbour Board constructed a wharf in 1882, which was followed by a post office in 1884. The new wharf allowed orchardists in Birkenhead to better transport produce to the Auckland market, further helped by larger orchardists building their own jetties on Oruamo or Hellyers Creek in the north. In 1886, the Birkenhead and Northcote Fruitgrowing Association was formed.

By the 1880s, itinerant gum diggers roamed Birkenhead, searching for kauri gum. Birkenhead residents loathed the gum diggers, who would often destroy roads, orchards and farms in order to locate kauri gum. In response, the Waitemata County Council lobbied the Crown to allow the country more direct control over the gum digging industry.

=== Chelsea Sugar Refinery and Birkenhead Borough ===
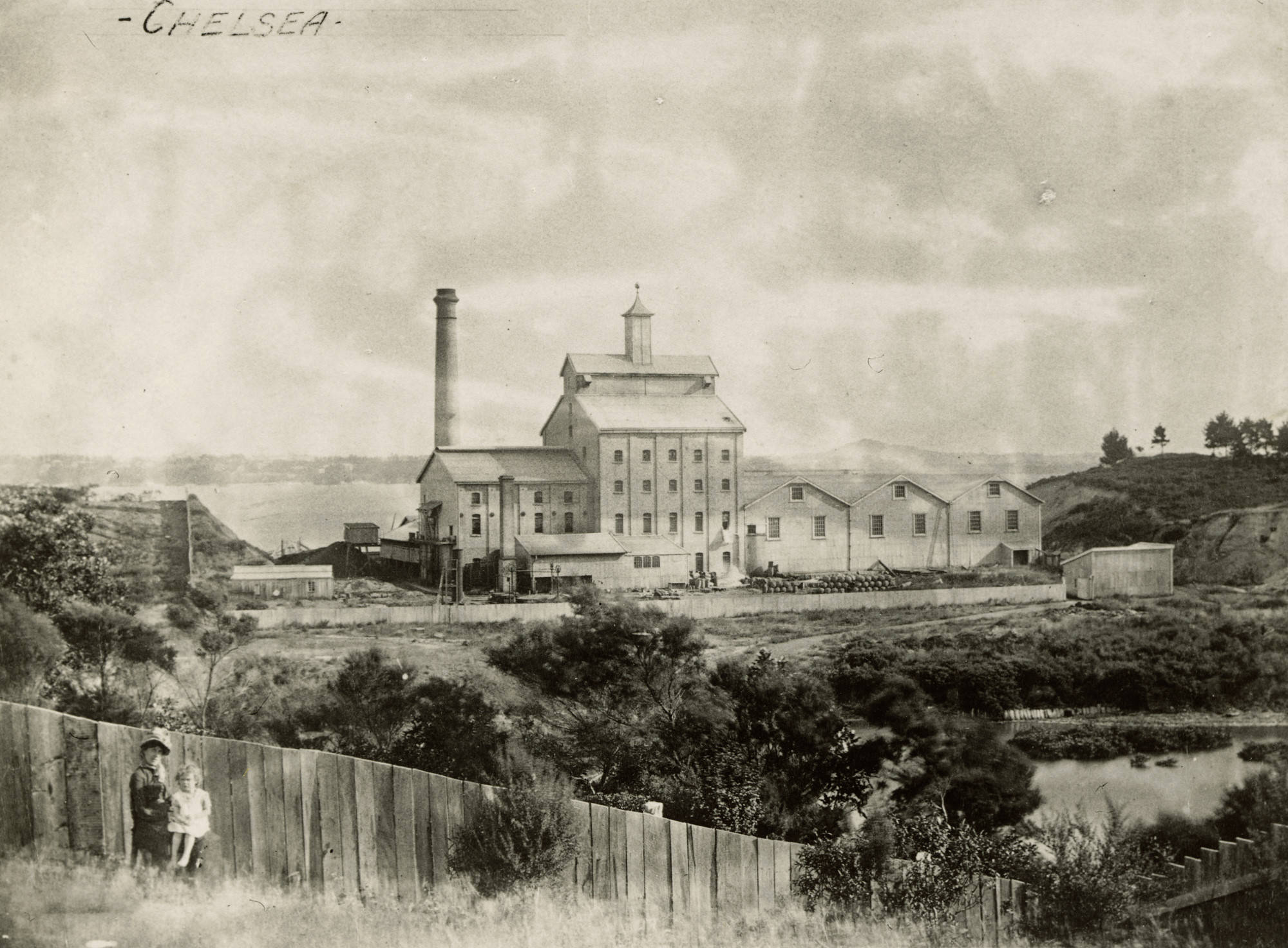
The Chelsea Sugar Refinery in 1885

In 1881, the Australasian Colonial Sugar Refining Company chose Birkenhead for the site of a new sugar refining factory, after founder Edward Knox visited Auckland. The refinery was chosen due to Auckland's relative proximity to the sugarcane plantations of Fiji, and south-eastern Birkenhead was chosen as it was one of the few deep water anchorages of the Waitematā Harbour, and due to its proximity to the fresh water Duck Creek. The factory opened in 1884, and by 1888 had greatly increased production. The factory continues to be the largest single site industrial facility on the North Shore.

The establishment of Chelsea Sugar Refinery led to a population explosion in Birkenhead and the surrounding areas, and led to Birkenhead developing into a suburban township. In the mid-1880s, a factory village was constructed adjacent for workers at the factory. Mr Judd, the first customs officer, successfully convinced the Colonial Sugar Refining Company to call both the factory and adjacent company village Chelsea, after his hometown in England.

On 12 April 1888, with only 330 ratepayers living in the area, the Borough of Birkenhead was established as one of the earliest boroughs of Auckland. Birkenhead was one of the largest boroughs of New Zealand in area size, and tensions existed between the township at Highbury and more rural Birkdale. Highbury residents wanted more funding to be put aside for urban projects such as improved footpaths, frustrating rural Birkdale residents, who needed better rural roads, especially during the strawberry harvesting season.

In 1885, the Zion Hill Methodist Church was constructed, becoming a major focal point for social life in Birkenhead. The church visually dominated Birkenhead due to its position on the hill, and was a strong voice for the temperance movement, lobbying against hotels from being established in Birkenhead. The church and Chelsea Sugar Refinery were the two largest influences on life for Birkenhead residents at the turn of the 20th century.

=== Fruit canning and the Sugar Workers Union ===
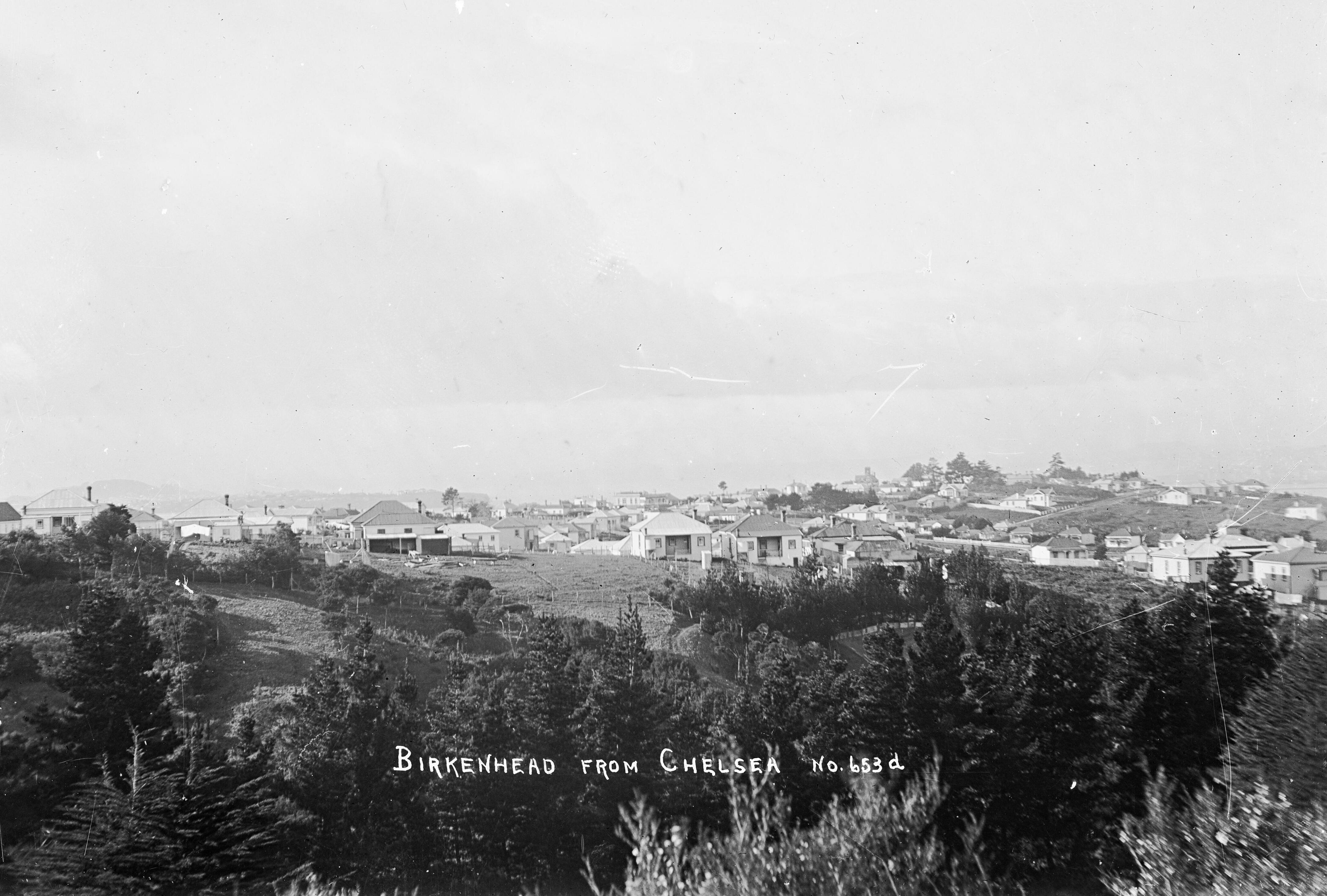
View of Birkenhead circa 1910

By the 1890s, Birkenhead became so well-known for strawberry farms that daytrippers and picknickers would travel to Birkenhead for the growing season. Growers were increasingly frustrated with the high cost of transporting fruit, and many began establishing canning and jam production operations. One of these operations was Thompson's, which began as a home operation in Birkenhead in 1898. By the following year, the firm moved to a factory on Nelson Street in the Auckland City Centre, growing to become Thompson & Hills, one of the largest canning factories and jam producers in New Zealand in the early 20th century.

Growers struggled with poor apple and pear crops due to codling moths, so by 1900 turned to growing nectarines and plums. Commercial fruitgrowing increasingly disappeared from Birkenhead by the 1910s, after becoming unprofitable.

By the turn of the century, Birkenhead had developed into three centres: suburban Birkenhead, rural Birkdale and Chelsea, adjacent to the refinery. The factory provided steady work for the community, employing a third of the workforce of Birkenhead, and allowing farmers and orchardists stability in years with poorer crops. The ferry service brought new residents to the area who commuted to Auckland for work, although fewer than neighbouring Devonport; only three stores were located in Birkenhead in 1901. The Birkenhead ferry developed a café atmosphere for the commuters, which included string instrument players, and a smokers cabin, where man of Birkenhead discussed politics.

Workers at the factory complained of poor conditions, such as 58-hour work weeks, and unsafe conditions in the wash house, where employers would be dismissed if they stopped working due to heat exhaustion. In 1901, the Sugar Workers Union was formed, pushing for safer conditions and a reduction to a 48-hour work week. In 1905, the Chelsea workers village was condemned. Following this, Chelsea factory management established the HAWE (Housing Assistance for Wage Earners) Scheme in 1910, where workers were provided with low-interest loans to construct or buy houses close to the refinery.

In 1910, the Wragge Institute and Museum and Waiata Tropical Gardens were established in Awanui Street. Run by British meteorologist and spiritualist Clement Lindley Wragge and his Anglo-Indian de facto partner Louisa "Edris" Emmeline Horne, the gardens featured a wide range of exotic edible plants and palm trees, becoming a well-known tourist spot. The centre promoted the planting of palm trees around Auckland.

=== Cinema and World Wars ===
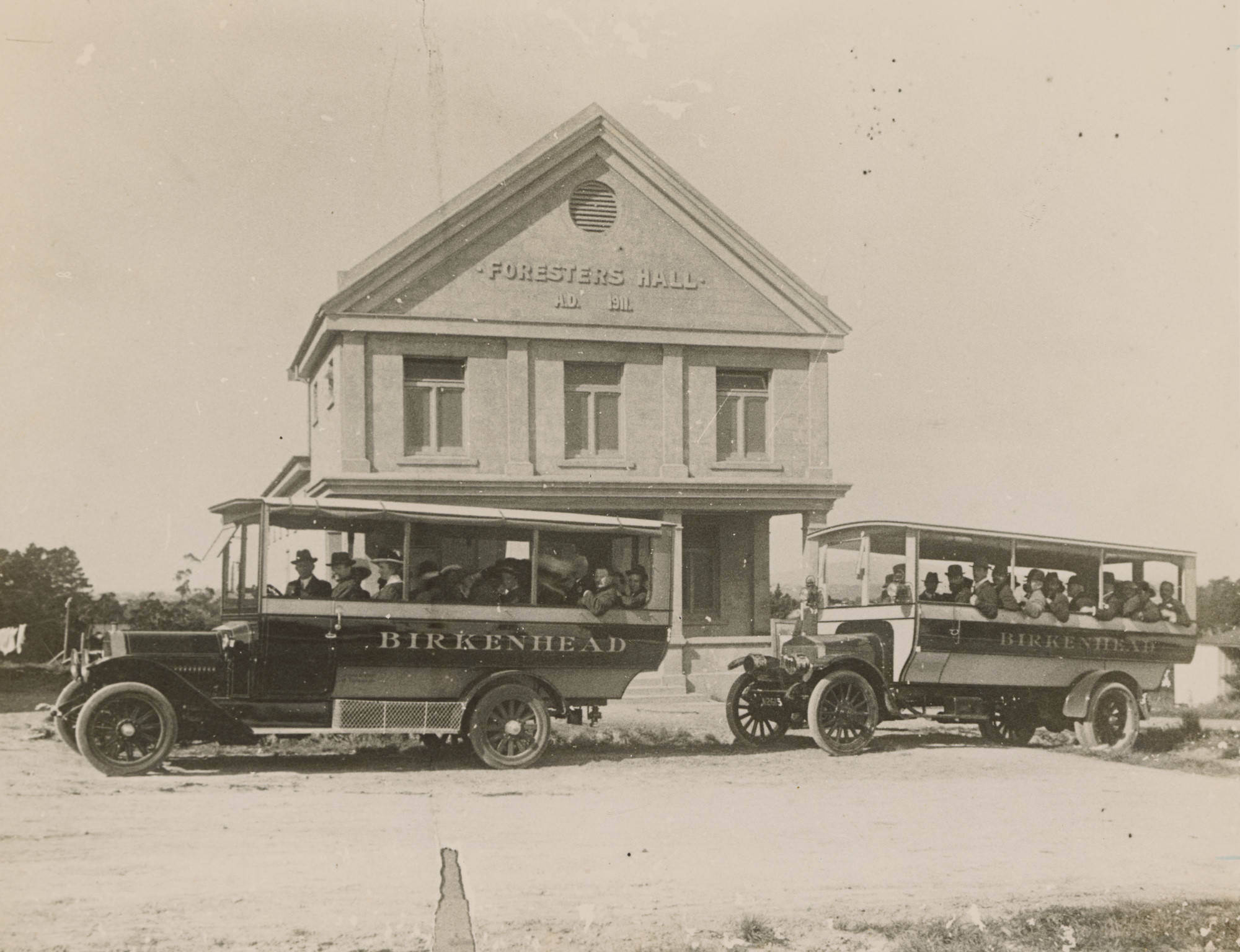
Buses from Birkenhead Motor Bus and Transit Company parked in front of the Foresters Hall, one of the first cinemas in Auckland (1915)

In 1911, the Ancient Order of Foresters built a hall on Hinemoa Street in Birkenhead. In the following year, theatre company manager Henry John Hayward, who lived at Birkenhead, began showing films at Foresters Hall in 1912. Birkenhead became the second suburb of Auckland to have a cinema, and by the 1920s the Foresters Hall had become a major attraction for people across Auckland to attend dances and film showings.

By 1913, Birkenhead had grown to have 12 stores (compared to 42 in Devonport), including the 1913 Hellaby's butchery, the first building with a tiled ceiling constructed in Australasia. An increased population led to plans for a new school to open in 1914 on a portion of Edward Skeate's Highbury estate, but plans for a school were delayed until 1919, due to the outbreak of World War I. 261 men and boys from Birkenhead served in the war. This greatly affected the community, which was further impacted by the 1918 flu pandemic.

Highbury developed more commercial and residential housing in the 1920s, and was the location of the Birkenhead Borough Chambers. From 1959, the stores of Highbury began declining due to the opening of the Auckland Harbour Bridge, despite an explosion of population growth in the surrounding suburbs. A small state housing area was constructed at Hammond Place, and in the mid-1970s the Highbury Bypass was constructed, linking Mokoia Road to Onewa Road, without the need to drive through Highbury.

In December 1926, electricity was first installed in Birkenhead, and in January 1934 water infrastructure was greatly improved. Having used water piped from Lake Pupuke until this time, the pipe pumped water from Western Springs to Birkenhead under the Waitematā Harbour, and was the longest pipe of its kind when installed.

Farms in Birkenhead offered increasingly poor harvests through the 1920s, due to the soil being overworked. Farmers turned away from strawberries, growing crops such as pumpkins and tomatoes instead. By the 1930s during the Great Depression, many farms had become unprofitable. During these times, the Birkenhead Borough operated an unemployment loan scheme for residents, and relief workers worked on infrastructure projects including drain digging, clearing scrubland and improving roads. The last commercial strawberry fields were removed in the 1940s.

In 1938 on the eve of World War II, the New Zealand Government established the Kauri Point Armament Depot at Birkenhead. 332 soldiers and one nurse from Birkenhead enlisted, of whom 29 died. Chelsea Sugar Refinery workers were protected from enlistment, and many residents serves as a part of the Home Guard. While never employed, the Home Guard dug anti-tank tranches on the Glenfield ridge, and practiced warfare at Eskdale Reserve. Many women of Birkenhead took up jobs traditionally held by men, including working at the offices and golden syrup room at Chelsea Sugar Refinery, and working at the Kauri Point Armament Depot. The arrival of American troops in Auckland helped Birkenhead flowers, due to the increased need for fresh food and flowers.

=== Suburban development ===
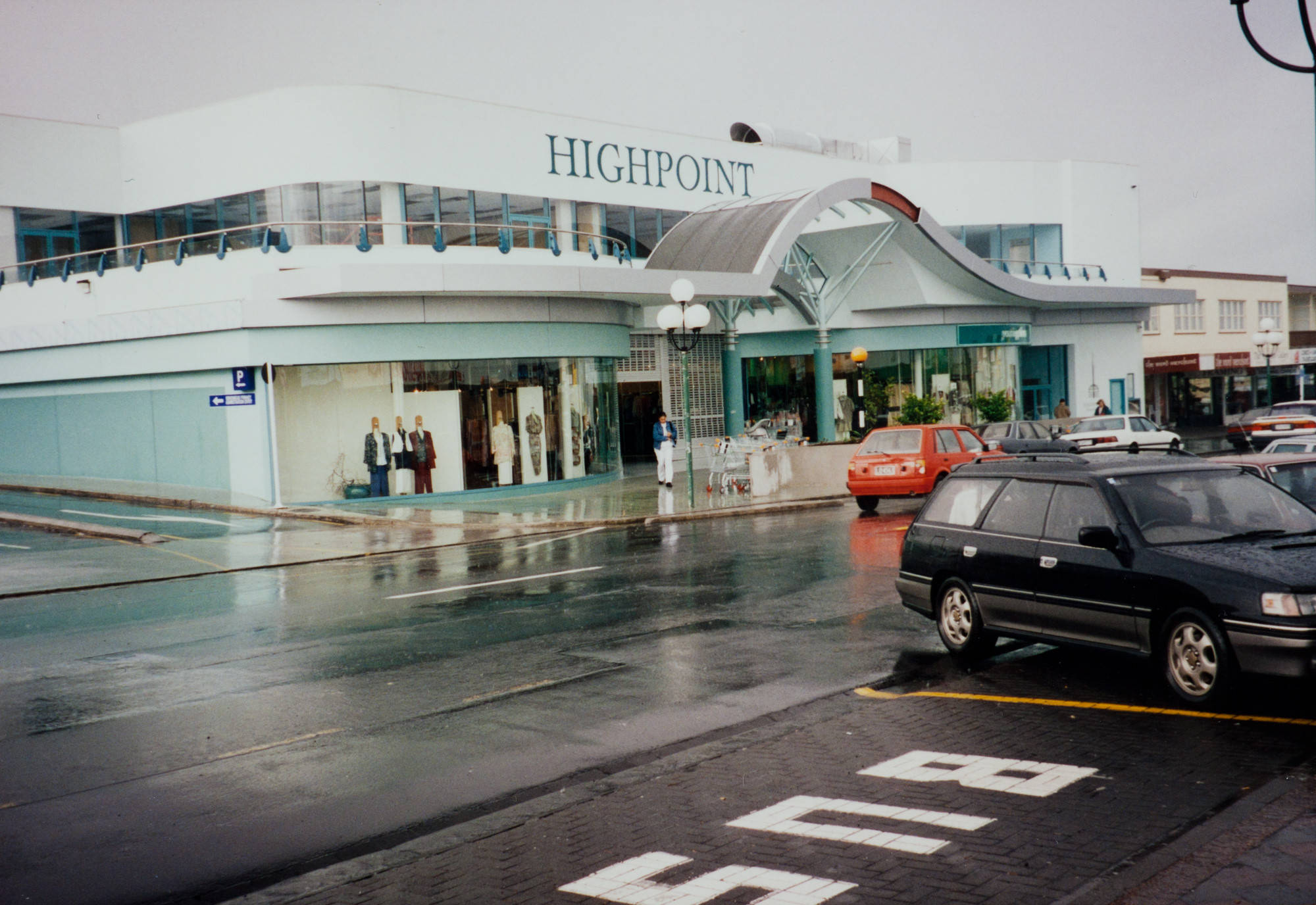
Highpoint Shopping Centre shortly after opening on 8 May 1995

In the 1950s, Birkenhead was a semi-rural area of Auckland, with only the areas close to the Birkenhead Wharf having a suburban atmosphere. In 1959, the Auckland Harbour Bridge opened, which rapidly brought Birkenhead closer to Auckland. The North Shore wharves of the Waitematā Harbour stopped being major transport nodes, and instead, areas with views of the Waitematā Harbour rose in importance for suburban housing. From 1960, the Birkenhead Borough Council encouraged construction of low-cost suburban houses in the borough, and a small state housing area was constructed at Hammond Place (near Highbury Pass).

Birkenhead's population and commercial centre rapidly developed in the 1970s, helped in part by the development of Wairau Valley as an industrial park. From the 1970s, Samoan New Zealander and Urban Māori communities developed around Birkenhead, many of whom worked at Wairau Valley and the Sugar Refinery. After the population exceeded 20,000 people, Birkenhead Borough became the City of Birkenhead in 1978.

In the mid-1980s, the Borough Council planned to develop a new supermarket at Highbury, to counteract commercial decline. In 1989, Highbury became a part of North Shore City, and the new city council began planning the Strawberry Fields Shopping Centre from 1990, with Countdown as an anchor store. On 8 May 1995, the shopping centre formally opened, now named Highpoint Shopping Centre. In 1997 after expansions, the mall was renamed Birkenhead Shopping Centre, and later renamed to Highbury Shopping Centre in the mid-2000s. By the 2000s, Birkenhead Town Centre had developed a restaurant culture.

In November 2010, the suburb was included into the North Shore ward, one of the thirteen administrative divisions of the newly-formed Auckland Council. Under the council, Birkenhead is part of the Kaipātiki Local Board Area.

== Demographics ==
Birkenhead covers 4.52 km^{2} (1.75 sq mi) and had an estimated population of 10,730 as of June 2025, with a population density of 2,374 people per km^{2}.

Historical population
Year	Pop.	±% p.a.
2006	9,306	—
2013	9,363	+0.09%
2018	10,242	+1.81%
2023	10,341	+0.19%
The 2006 population is for a larger area of 4.63 km^{2}. Source:

Birkenhead had a population of 10,341 in the 2023 New Zealand census, an increase of 99 people (1.0%) since the 2018 census, and an increase of 978 people (10.4%) since the 2013 census. There were 4,971 males, 5,331 females and 42 people of other genders in 3,852 dwellings. 4.6% of people identified as LGBTIQ+. The median age was 39.7 years (compared with 38.1 years nationally). There were 1,692 people (16.4%) aged under 15 years, 1,854 (17.9%) aged 15 to 29, 4,965 (48.0%) aged 30 to 64, and 1,830 (17.7%) aged 65 or older.

People could identify as more than one ethnicity. The results were 75.2% European (Pākehā); 7.2% Māori; 2.7% Pasifika; 21.2% Asian; 3.2% Middle Eastern, Latin American and African New Zealanders (MELAA); and 1.6% other, which includes people giving their ethnicity as "New Zealander". English was spoken by 95.3%, Māori language by 1.2%, Samoan by 0.2%, and other languages by 23.4%. No language could be spoken by 1.9% (e.g. too young to talk). New Zealand Sign Language was known by 0.2%. The percentage of people born overseas was 39.0, compared with 28.8% nationally.

Religious affiliations were 28.8% Christian, 2.1% Hindu, 1.1% Islam, 0.3% Māori religious beliefs, 1.5% Buddhist, 0.6% New Age, 0.3% Jewish, and 1.2% other religions. People who answered that they had no religion were 58.3%, and 6.0% of people did not answer the census question.

Of those at least 15 years old, 3,813 (44.1%) people had a bachelor's or higher degree, 3,408 (39.4%) had a post-high school certificate or diploma, and 1,425 (16.5%) people exclusively held high school qualifications. The median income was $53,400, compared with $41,500 nationally. 1,986 people (23.0%) earned over $100,000 compared to 12.1% nationally. The employment status of those at least 15 was that 4,761 (55.0%) people were employed full-time, 1,182 (13.7%) were part-time, and 171 (2.0%) were unemployed.

Individual statistical areas
Name	Area (km^{2})	Population	Density (per km^{2})	Dwellings	Median age	Median income
Birkenhead West	1.04	2,946	2,833	1,113	41.8 years	$46,400
Birkenhead North West	1.11	1,524	1,373	528	36.4 years	$58,800
Birkenhead North	1.01	2,817	2,789	1,032	36.5 years	$51,100
Birkenhead South	1.36	3,057	2,248	1,179	42.8 years	$59,400
New Zealand					38.1 years	$41,500

== Local government ==
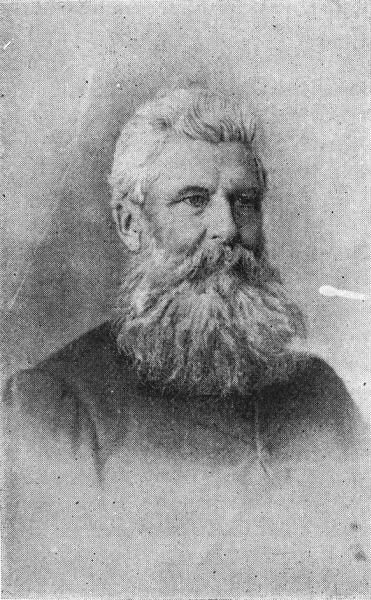
Charles Button, first mayor of Birkenhead Borough (1888–1901)

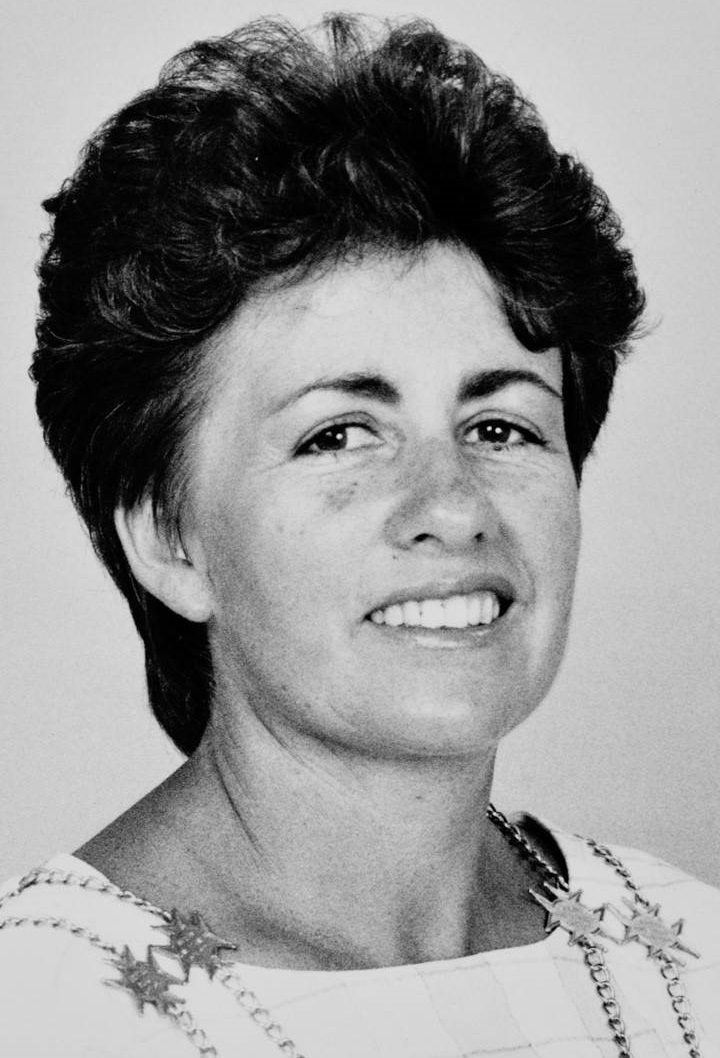
Ann Hartley, last mayor of Birkenhead City (1986–1989)

The first local government in the area was the North Shore Highway District, which began operating in 1868 and administered roading and similar projects across the North Shore. From 1876, Birkenhead was also a part of the Takapuna Riding of Waitemata County; a large rural county north and west of the city of Auckland. In 1884 the Birkenhead Road District split from the North Shore Highway District.

On 12 April 1888, with only 330 ratepayers the Birkenhead Road District became the Borough of Birkenhead, one of the earliest boroughs of Auckland. The borough had a mayor and a local council, and was able to make more decisions on how to invest in the area. After 90 years due to major growth in the mid-20th century, Birkenhead became a city on 15 March 1978, with a population of 20,000 people. In 1989, Birkenhead was merged into the North Shore City. North Shore City was amalgamated into Auckland Council in November 2010.

Within Auckland Council, Birkenhead is a part of the Kaipātiki Local Board. It is a part of the North Shore ward, which elects two councillors to the Auckland Council.

=== Mayors during Birkenhead Borough Council ===
	Name	Term
1	Charles Button	1888–1901
2	Joseph Witheford	1901–1905
3	Albert Frederick Porter	1905–1906
4	Alexander Keyes	1906–1911
5	John Green Kay	1911–1912
6	William Wallace	1912–1915
7	James McPhail	1915–1921
8	John William Court	1921–1922
9	Albert Hadfield	1922–1923
10	Edward Cranston Walton	1923–1925
11	Ernest Skeates	1925–1929
(7)	James McPhail	1929–1932
12	George Mills	1932–1936
13	Ernie Osborne	1936–1953
14	Cliff Utting	1953–1959
15	Cyril Crocombe	1959–1968
16	Bert Stanley	1968–1977
17	Graham Stott	1977–1978

=== Mayors during Birkenhead City Council ===
	Name	Term
1	Graham Stott	1978–1986
2	Ann Hartley	1986–1989

== Economy ==
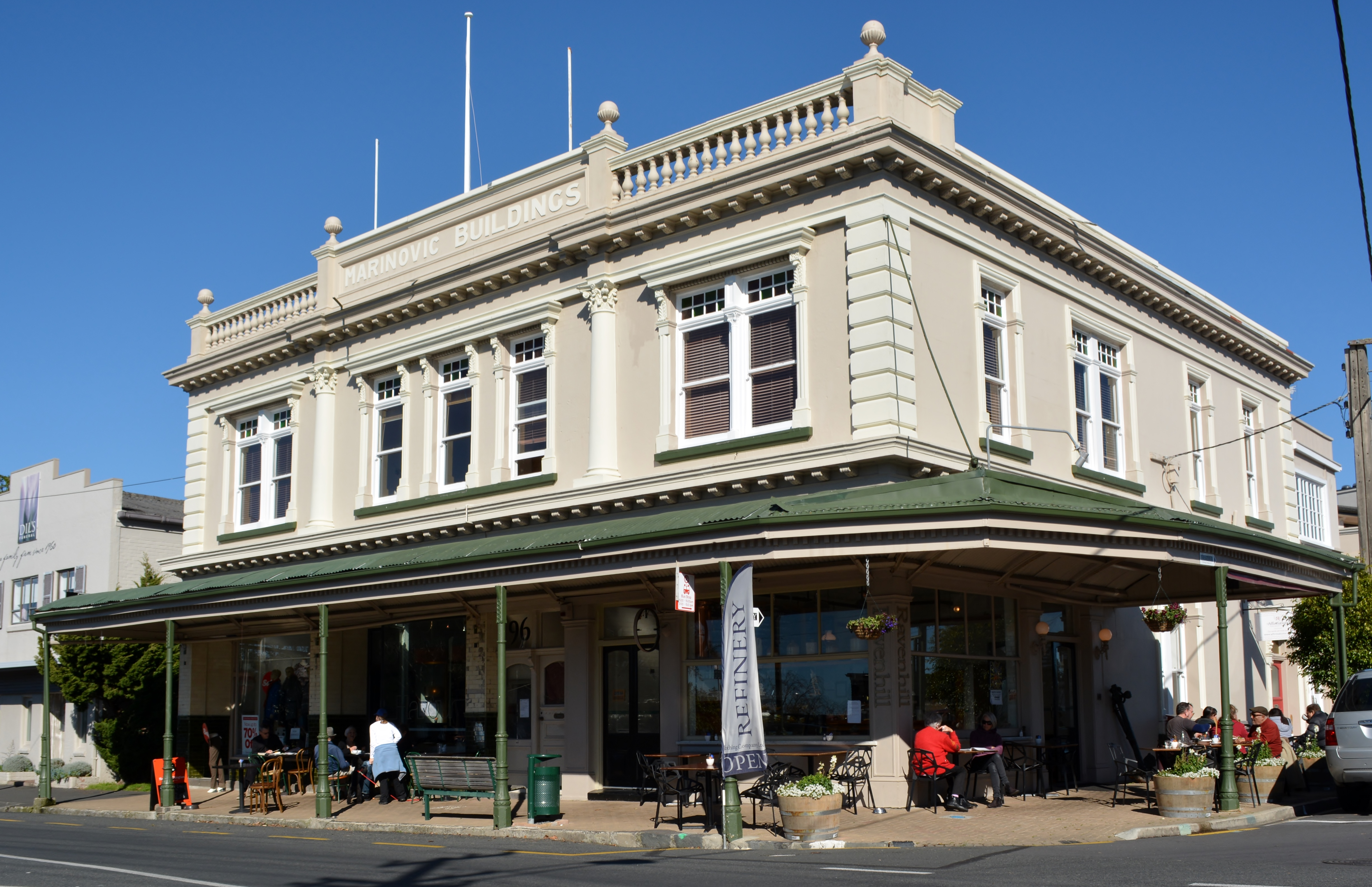
A cafe in Hinemoa Street

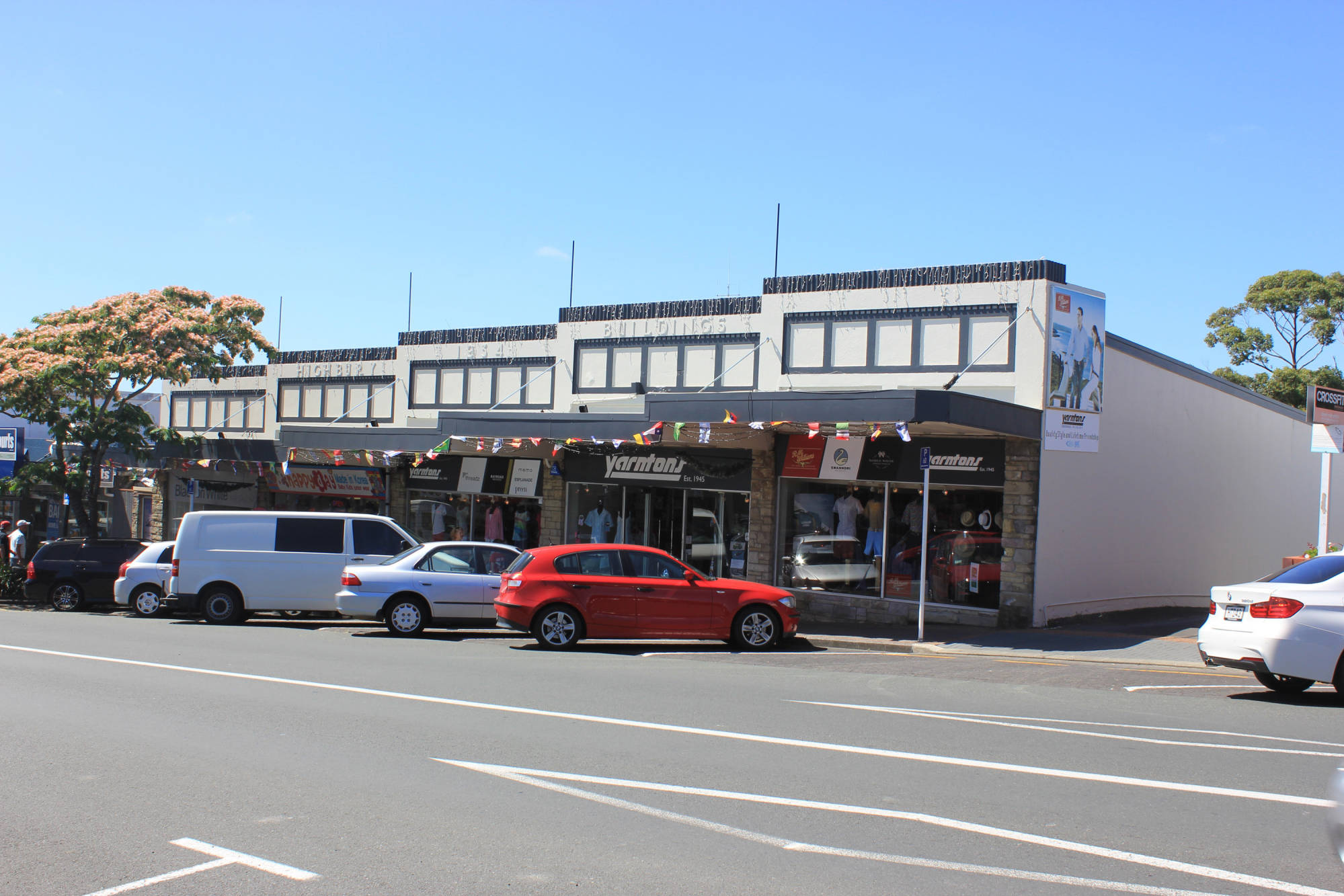
Highbury Buildings on Mokoia Road

Highbury Shopping Centre is located in Birkenhead. It includes 600 carparks and 25 retailers, including a Countdown supermarket. The central Birkenhead shopping area is known as the Birkenhead Town Centre.

== Amenities ==
- Birkenhead Point is home to the Birkenhead Ferry Terminal, and features an all-tide boat ramp.
- Le Roys Bush is a native bush reserve located in Birkenhead.

== Sport ==
Birkenhead is home to Birkenhead United who compete in the Lotto Sport Italia NRFL Division 1B. During the 2023 FIFA Women's World Cup, Birkenhead United hosted the Italy women's national football team, and as a part of this their clubrooms were greatly upgraded.

== Education ==
Birkenhead School and Verran Primary School are coeducational contributing primary (years 1–6) schools with rolls of 457 and 214 respectively. Birkenhead School was founded in 1919 as an extension of Northcote School. Verran Primary School was founded in 1964. Rolls are as of July 2026.

== Notable people ==
- Clement Lindley Wragge, the meteorologist who began the tradition of using people's names for cyclones lived his final years at 8 Awanui Street, Birkenhead and planted palms in his, and neighbours', gardens.
- Rudall Hayward was an early NZ film-maker, producing Rewi's Last Stand (see Cinema of New Zealand)
- Hone Tuwhare, the poet, was briefly a Birkenhead Borough Councillor
- Hon Mike Rann CNZM, former Premier of South Australia, Australian High Commissioner to UK and Ambassador to Italy, lived in Birkenhead from 1964 to 1977.
- Edward Le Roy was a businessman who ran a tent making business in Auckland. Le Roys Bush and Le Roy Tce are named after him.

== See also ==
- Birkenhead Public Library
- Chelsea Sugar Refinery
- Le Roys Bush, Auckland

== Panorama ==
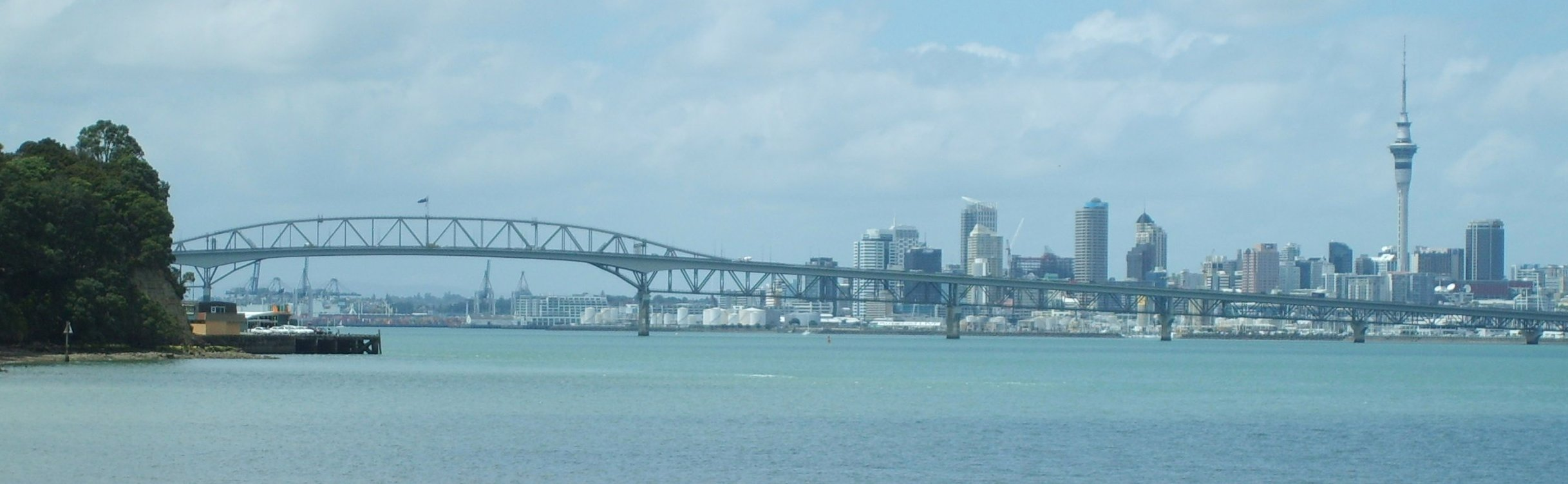
A view from Chelsea showing the Auckland Harbour Bridge and CBD. Birkenhead Wharf can be seen on the left, at the head of Birkenhead Point.

== Bibliography ==
- McClure, Margaret (1987). The Story of Birkenhead. Birkenhead City Council. ISBN 0-908704-04-6. OL 33998949W. Wikidata Q120679112.
- Verran, David (2010), The North Shore: An Illustrated History, North Shore: Random House, OL 33434370W, Wikidata Q120520385
