= Le Roys Bush =

Forest on the North Shore, New Zealand

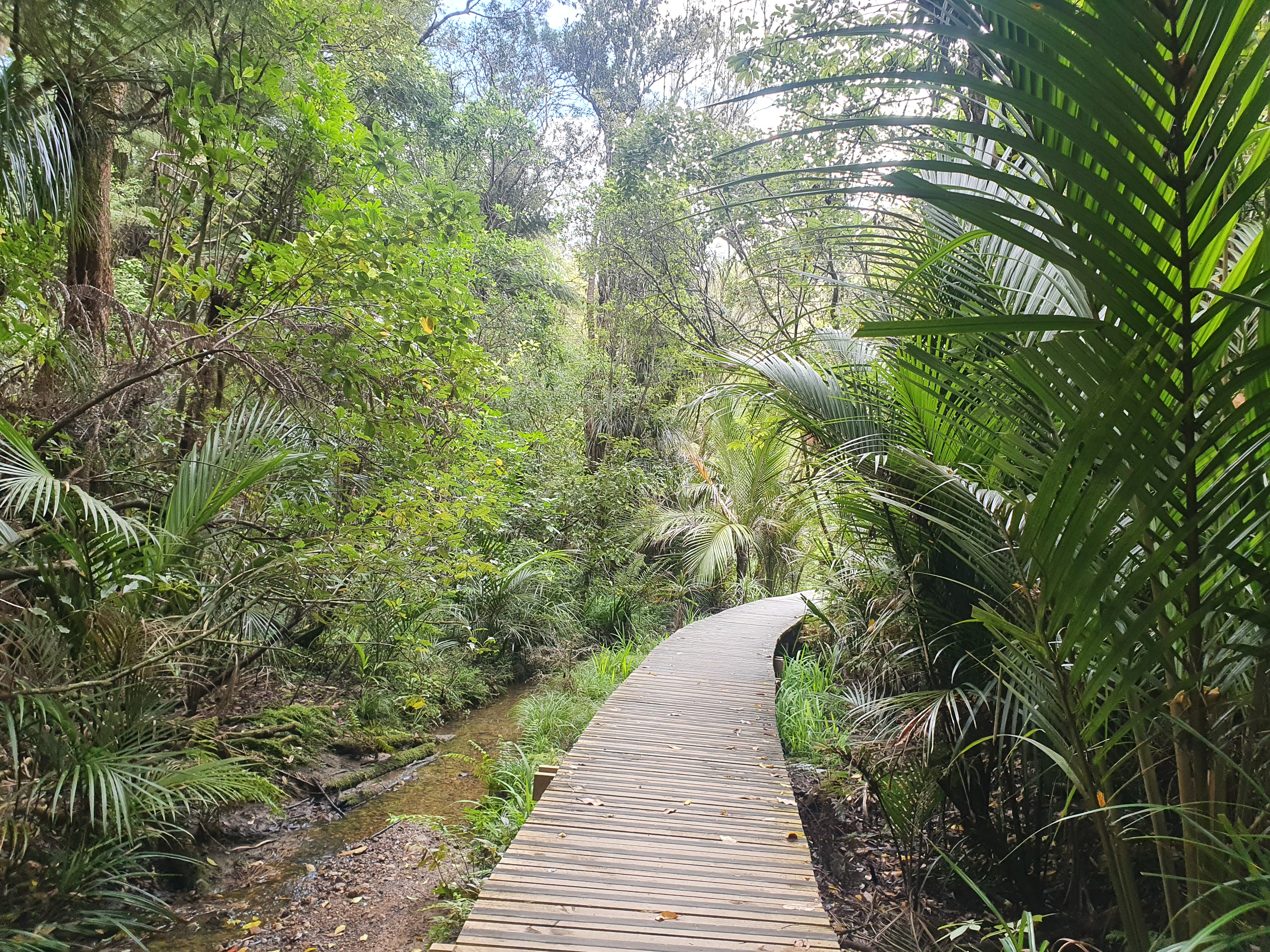
- A view of the Le Roys Bush walking track, where boardwalks are used to protect kauri
- Interactive map of Le Roys Bush
- Coordinates: 36.8129°S 174.7321°E

Le Roys Bush is a public reserve between Birkenhead and Northcote in Auckland, New Zealand.

== History ==
The northern valley of Le Roys Bush was known as Te Uruwao (or Te Uruao) by early Māori. The stream flowing through this valley forms a high waterfall.

Le Roys Bush was bought in 1918 by Edward Le Roy and named Urutapu. Edward established three ponds in which he grew water lilies and kept goldfish. He culverted streams to prevent flooding and piped the stream under the ponds, formed tracks through the bush and planted many native plants from Great Barrier and other parts of New Zealand.

After his death in 1947, the reserve was purchased by a public subscription organised by Mr Prickett and members of the North Shore Branch of the Forest and Bird Society. Over time, more parcels of bush were added to the reserve.

In the 1970s, Little Shoal Bay became a rubbish dump used by the Birkenhead Council. Local communities protested this, by sitting on bulldozers. Eventually, the councildecided to extend the reserve to include Little Shoal Bay.

In 2015, the mana whenua were consulted on the establishment of a lookout at the head of the Le Roys Bush stream and advised the name of the stream was Te Wai Manawa.

== Extent ==
Le Roys Bush (12 hectares) has been extended from the original block by addition of further purchases of bush-clad back yards. It extends from Highbury in Birkenhead down a valley between Birkenhead Point and Onewa Road, where it joins the Little Shoal Bay Reserve (7.5 hectares) and Lutners Reserve (2.6 hectares) near Wilding Ave in Northcote.

The term "Le Roys Bush" is used generally to refer to the whole area including Little Shoal Bay and Lutners Reserves.

== Flora and fauna ==
The 1998 management plan lists the various species found in the reserve. Links to the plan and other information can be found at LeRoysBush.nz

Infiltration of pest plants has been tackled by the Le Roys Bush Management Committee and contractors supported by grants from the Auckland Regional Council, Kaipatiki Local Board and the Birkenhead Licensing Trust. Rats and other predators are controlled by contractors withinin the reserve and by Beyond the Fence volunteers in the halo around the reserve.

Kauri dieback has been identified as a problem; foot-cleaning stations have been established in the bush to reduce the spread of the disease.
