= Chatswood =

Chatswood may refer to:

- Chatswood, New South Wales
  - Chatswood Oval, a sports ground
  - Chatswood railway station
- Chatswood, New Zealand

== See also ==
- Chatswood West, New South Wales
- Epping to Chatswood rail link, New South Wales
