= Waitematā Harbour =

Harbour in Auckland, New Zealand

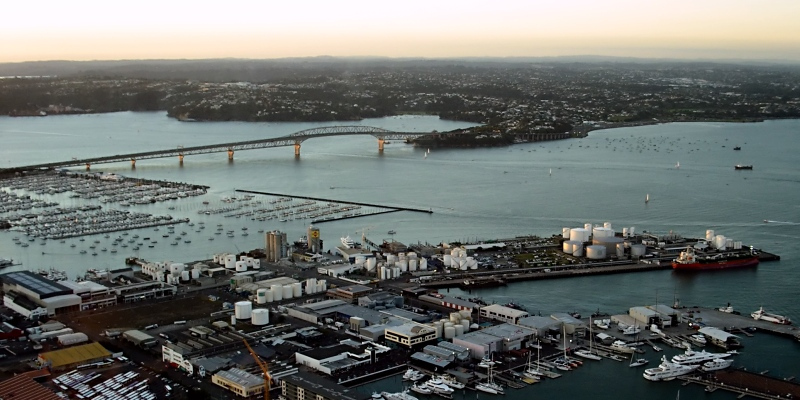
- A view of the Waitematā Harbour looking north-west towards the Auckland Harbour Bridge

- Location within New Zealand
- Interactive map of Waitematā Harbour
- Location: Auckland Region, New Zealand
- Coordinates: 36.83°S 174.73°E
- River sources: Meola Creek, Oakley Creek, Oruamo or Hellyers Creek, Waihorotiu Stream
- Ocean/sea sources: Pacific Ocean
- Basin countries: New Zealand
- Islands: Bean Rock, Boat Rock, Herald Island, Pollen Island, Traherne Island, Watchman Island
- Sections/sub-basins: Te Wai-o-Pareira / Henderson Creek, Upper Waitematā Harbour, Whau River
- Settlements: Auckland

The Waitematā Harbour is the main access by sea to Auckland, New Zealand. The harbour forms the northern and eastern coasts of the Auckland isthmus and is crossed by the Auckland Harbour Bridge. It is matched on the southern side of the city by the shallower waters of the Manukau Harbour.

With an area of 70 square miles (180 km^{2}), it connects the city's main port and the Auckland waterfront to the Hauraki Gulf and the Pacific Ocean. It is sheltered from Pacific storms by Auckland's North Shore, Rangitoto Island, and Waiheke Island.

== Etymology ==
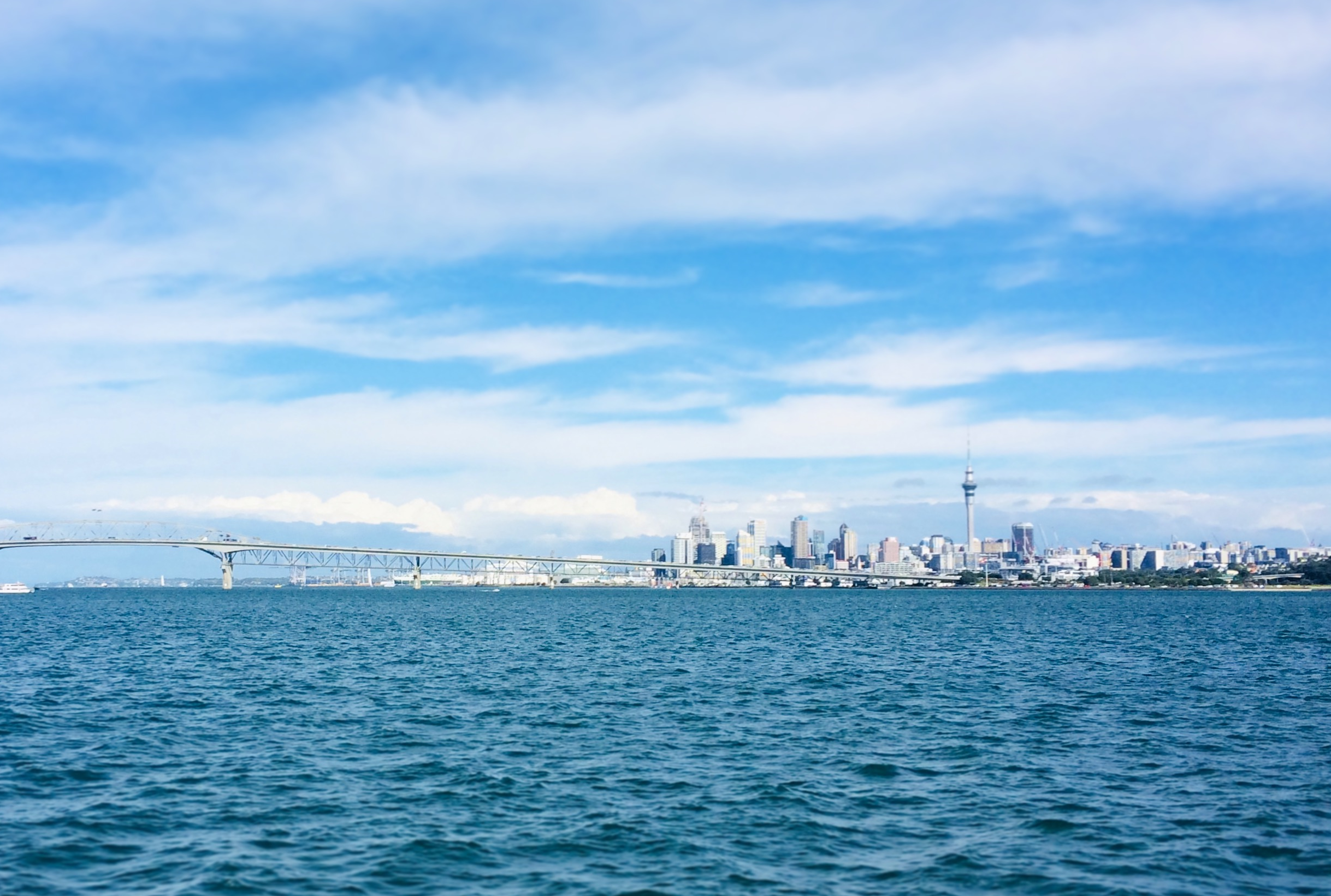
The Auckland City skyline from the Waitematā Harbour

The oldest Māori name of the harbour was Te Whanga-nui o Toi (The Big Bay of Toi), named after Toi, an early Māori explorer.

The name Waitematā means "Te Mata Waters", which according to some traditions refers to a mauri stone (a stone of Māori religious significance) called Te Mata, which was placed on Boat Rock (in the harbour south-west of Chatswood) by Te Arawa chief Kahumatamomoe. A popular translation of Waitematā is "The Obsidian Waters", referring to obsidian rock (matā). Another popular translation, derived from this, is "The Sparkling Waters", as the harbour waters were said to glint like the volcanic glass obsidian. However, this is incorrect, as grammatically Waitematā could not mean this.

== Geography ==
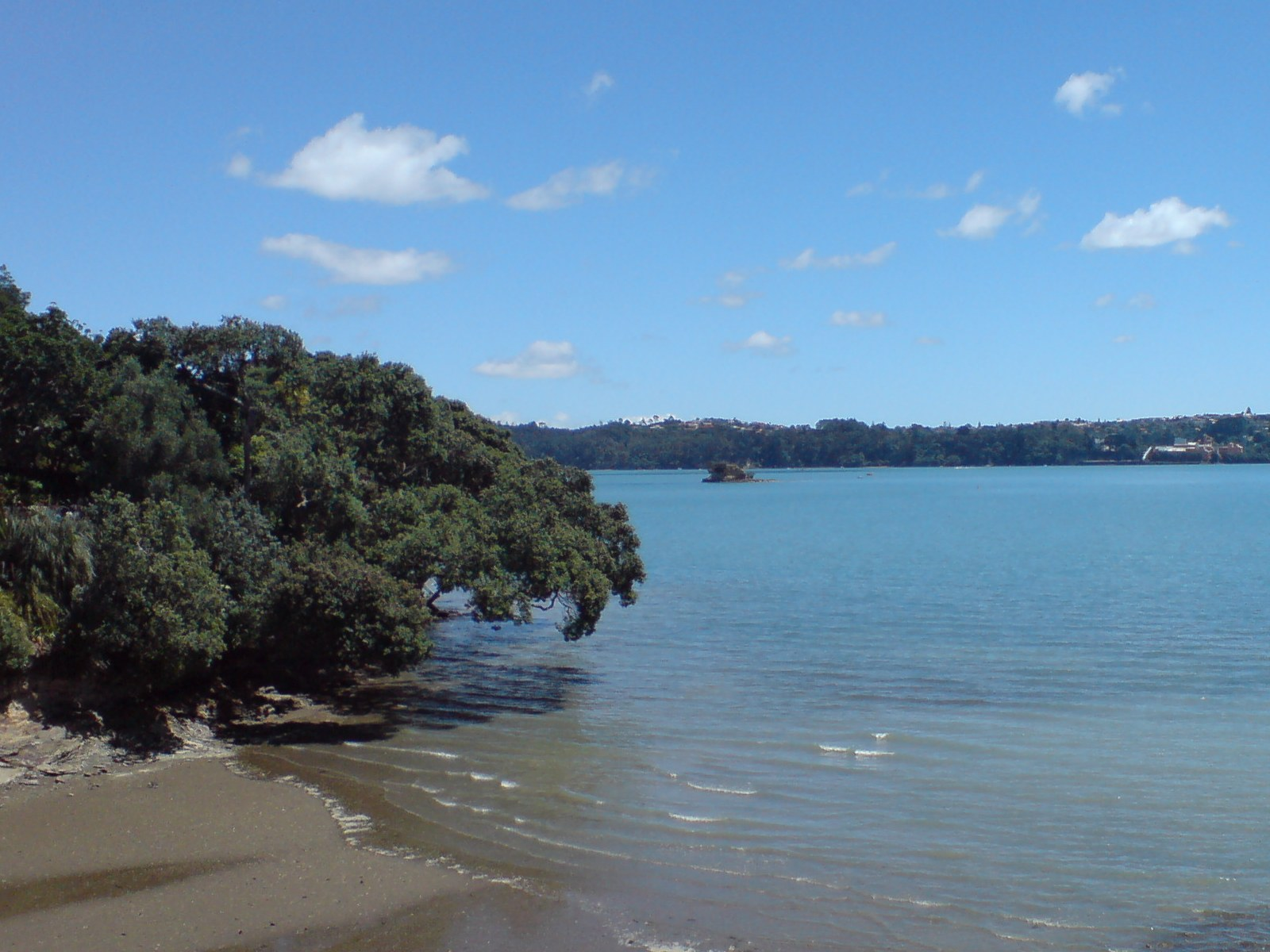
The eastern edge of Herne Bay, one of the wooded beach reserves typical of the harbour.

The harbour is an arm of the Hauraki Gulf, extending west for eighteen kilometres from the end of the Rangitoto Channel. Its entrance is between North Head and Bastion Point in the south. The westernmost ends of the harbour extend past Whenuapai in the northwest, and to Te Atatū Peninsula in the west, as well as forming the estuarial arm known as the Whau River in the southwest.

The northern shore of the harbour consists of North Shore. North Shore suburbs located closest to the shoreline include Birkenhead, Northcote and Devonport (west to east). On the southern side of the harbour is Auckland CBD and the Auckland waterfront, and coastal suburbs such as Mission Bay, Parnell, Herne Bay and Point Chevalier (east to west), the latter of which lies on a short triangular peninsula jutting into the harbour.

The harbour is crossed at its narrowest point by the Auckland Harbour Bridge. To the east of the bridge's southern end lie the marinas of Westhaven and the suburbs of Freemans Bay and the Viaduct Basin. Further east from these, and close to the harbour's entrance, lies the Port of Auckland.

There are other wharves and ports within the harbour, notable among them the Devonport Naval Base, and the accompanying Kauri Point Armament Depot at Birkenhead, and the Chelsea Sugar Refinery wharf, all capable of taking ships over 500 gross register tons (GRT). Smaller wharves at Birkenhead, Beach Haven, Northcote, Devonport and West Harbour offer commuter ferry services to the Auckland CBD.

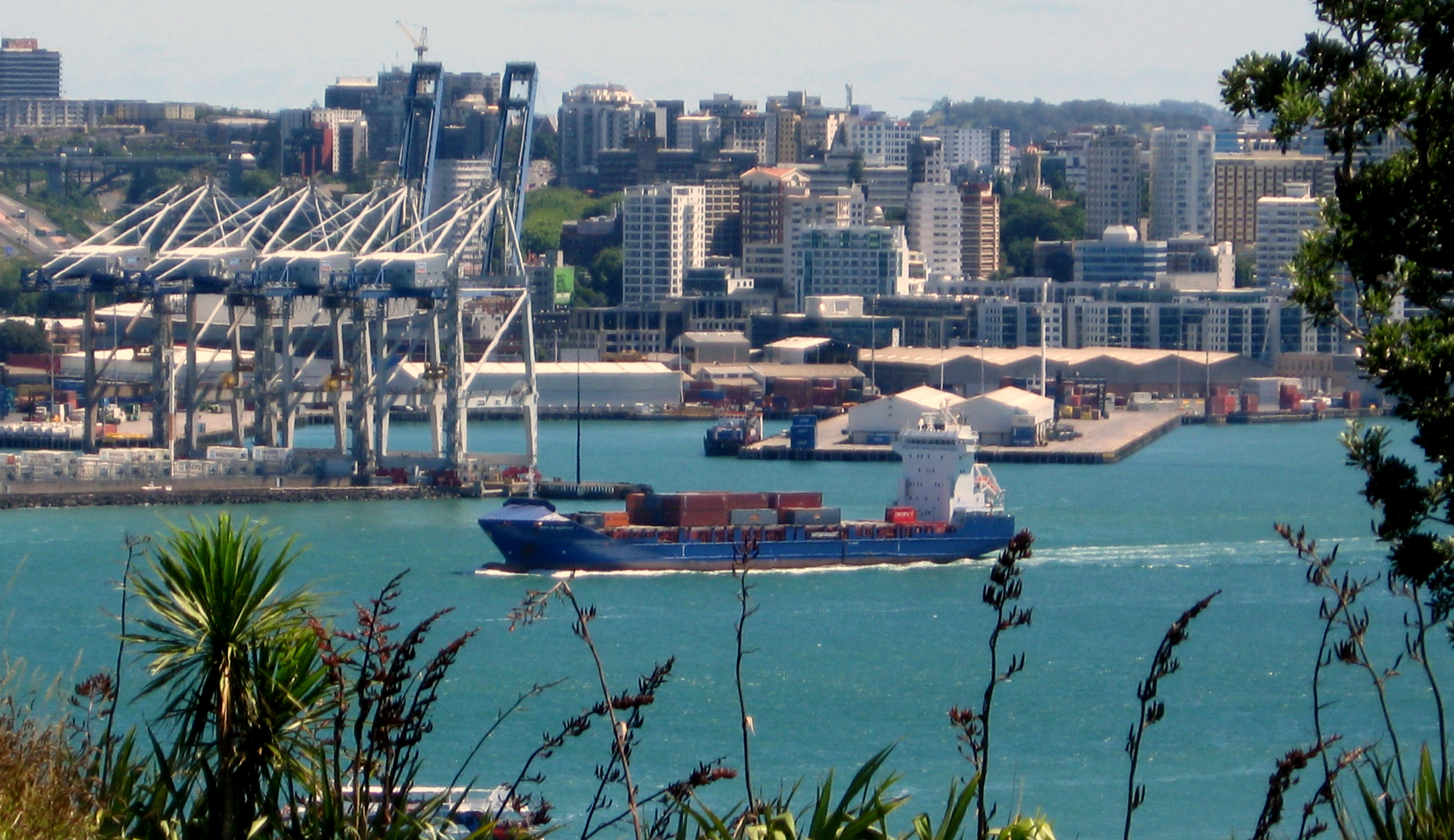
A container ship sailing out of the harbour

== Geology ==
The harbour is a drowned valley system that was carved through Miocene marine sediments of the Waitemata Group. Recent volcanism in the Auckland volcanic field has also shaped the coast, most obviously at Devonport and the Meola Reef (a lava flow which almost spans the harbour), but also in the explosion craters of Orakei Basin and in western Shoal Bay. Over the last two million years, the harbour has cycled between periods of being a forested river valley and a flooded harbour. In periods of low sea level, a tributary ran from Milford into the Shoal Bay stream. This valley provided the harbour with a second entrance when sea levels rose, until the Lake Pupuke volcano plugged this gap.

Approximately 17,000 years ago during the Last Glacial Period when sea levels were significantly lower, the river flowed north-east along the Rangitoto Channel, meeting the Mahurangi River to the east of Kawau Island. The resulting river flowed further north-east between modern day Little Barrier Island and Great Barrier Island, eventually emptying into the Pacific Ocean north of Great Barrier Island.

The current shore is strongly influenced by tidal rivers, particularly in the west and north of the harbour. Mudflats covered by mangroves flourish in these conditions, and salt marshes are also typical.

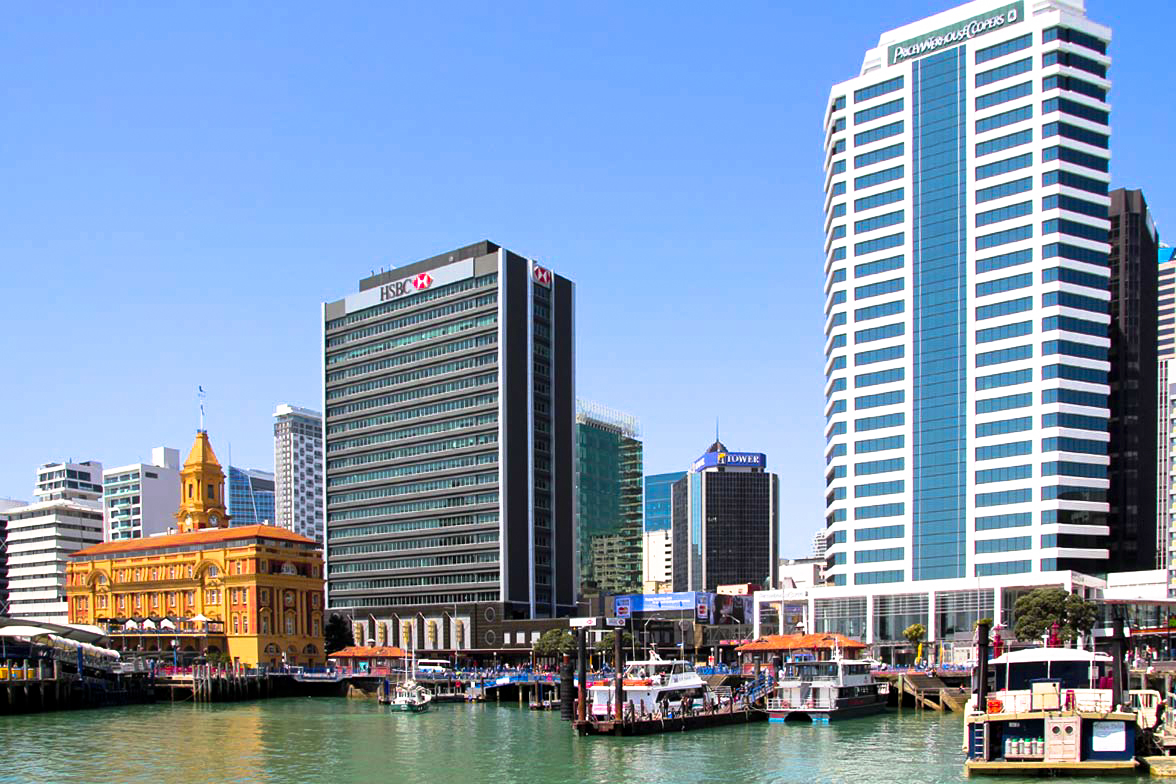
The Auckland waterfront, one of the most popular areas of the Waitematā Harbour

== History ==
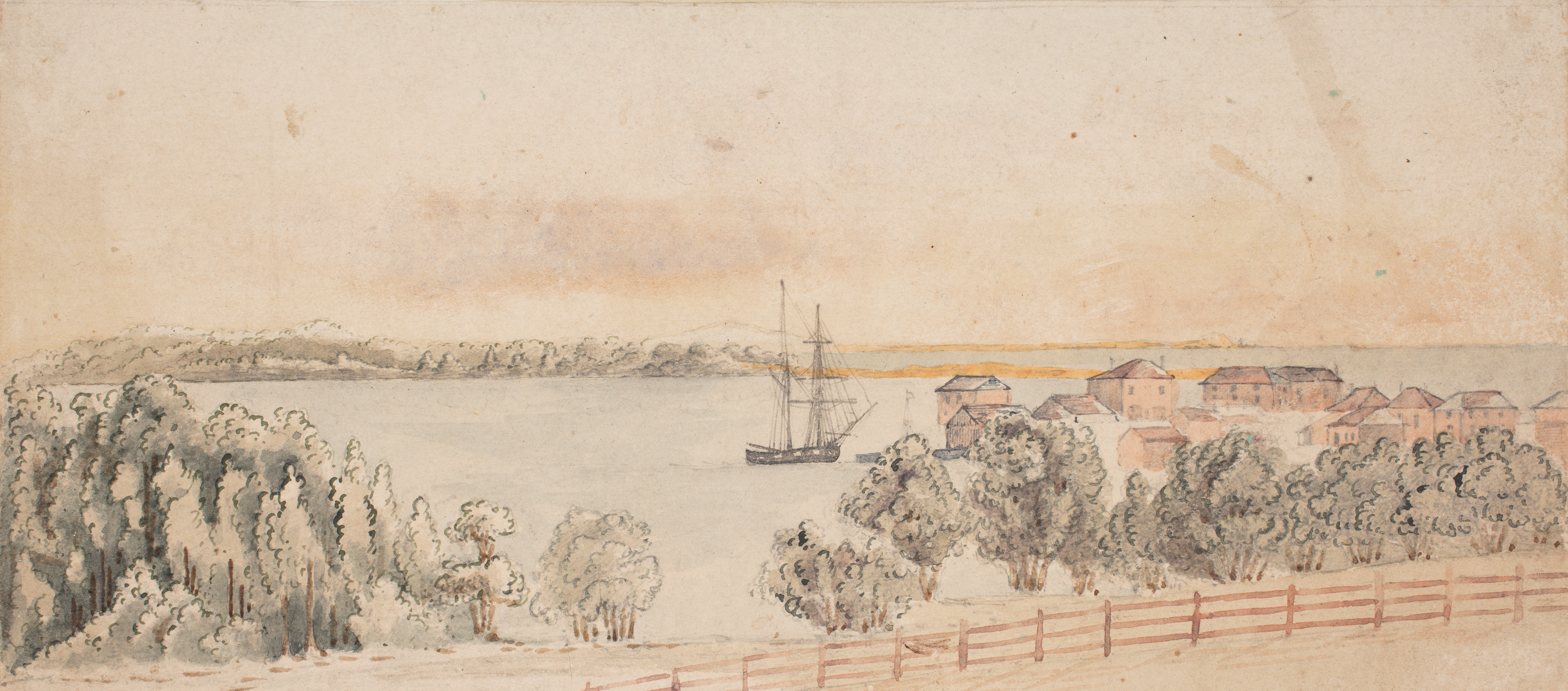
A sketch by John Johnson (1794-1848) of the Waitematā Harbour as seen from the suburb of Ponsonby

Prior to European settlement, the harbour was the site of many Tāmaki Māori pā and kāinga, including Kauri Point in Chatswood, Okā at Point Erin, Te Tō at Freemans Bay, Te Ngahuwera, Te Rerenga-oraiti at Point Britomart, and Ōrākei. Herald Island and Watchman Island were both settled by the Waiohua confederation. The Waitematā Harbour was traditionally used as a fishery used by Tāmaki Māori for sharks and snapper. In the late 18th century and early 19th century, the waters were fished together by Ngāti Whātua-o-Ōrākei and Ngāti Pāoa. In traditional legend, the Waitematā Harbour is protected by a taniwha named Ureia, who takes the form of a whale.

The harbour has long been the main anchorage and port area for the Auckland region. Well-sheltered not only by the Hauraki Gulf itself but also by Rangitoto Island, the harbour offered good protection in almost all winds, and lacked dangerous shoals or major sand bars (like on the Manukau Harbour) that would have made entry difficult. The harbour also proved a fertile area for encroaching development, with major land reclamation undertaken, especially along the Auckland waterfront, within a few decades of the city's European founding.

Taking the idea of the several Māori portage paths over the isthmus one step further, the creation of a canal that would link the Waitematā and Manukau harbours was considered in the early 1900s. Legislation (the Auckland and Manukau Canal Act 1908) was passed that would allow authorities to take privately owned land where it was deemed required for a canal. However, no serious work (or land take) was undertaken. The act was repealed on 1 November 2010.

In 1982, a group that included leaders of the Anglican and Catholic proposed the construction of the Christ of the Ships, a 12 m (39 ft) bronze statue of Jesus be constructed on a reef in the Waitematā Harbour. The project was cancelled after facing significant opposition by Christian leaders from other denominations.

=== Sewage contamination ===
While the harbour has numerous beaches popular for swimming, the older-style "combined sewers" in several surrounding western suburbs dump contaminated wastewater overflows into the harbour on approximately 52 heavy-rain days a year, leading to regular health warnings at popular swimming beaches, until the outfalls have dispersed again. A major project, the Central Interceptor, starting 2019, is to reduce these outfalls by about 80% once completed around 2026.

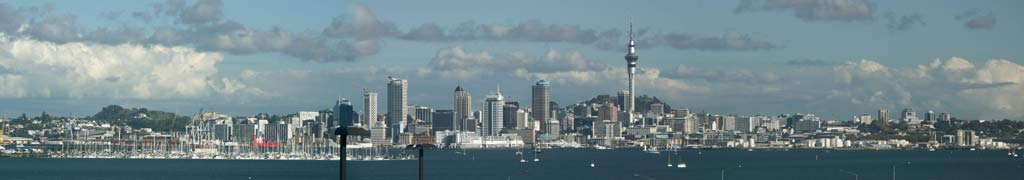
The Waitematā Harbour with the Sky Tower and Maungawhau / Mount Eden (behind Sky Tower) in the centre, as seen from the North Shore somewhere between Bayswater Marina (left) and the Harbour Bridge (out of frame, to the right).

== Demographics ==
Historical population
| Year | Pop. | ±% p.a. |
|---|---|---|
| 2006 | 21 | — |
| 2013 | 24 | +1.93% |
| 2018 | 84 | +28.47% |

The statistical area of Inlet Waitemata Harbour had a population of 84 at the 2018 New Zealand census, an increase of 60 people (250.0%) since the 2013 census, and an increase of 63 people (300.0%) since the 2006 census. There were no households. There were 60 males and 21 females, giving a sex ratio of 2.86 males per female. The median age was 25.5 years, with no people aged under 15 years, 54 (64.3%) aged 15 to 29, 21 (25.0%) aged 30 to 64, and 9 (10.7%) aged 65 or older.

Ethnicities were 50.0% European/Pākehā, 10.7% Māori, 3.6% Pacific peoples, 39.3% Asian, and no other ethnicities (totals add to more than 100% since people could identify with multiple ethnicities).

The proportion of people born overseas was 57.1%, compared with 27.1% nationally.

Although some people objected to giving their religion, 39.3% had no religion, 50.0% were Christian, and 3.6% had other religions.

Of those at least 15 years old, 9 (10.7%) people had a bachelor or higher degree, and 3 (3.6%) people had no formal qualifications. The median income was $40,200. The employment status of those at least 15 was that 54 (64.3%) people were employed full-time, 6 (7.1%) were part-time, and 0 (0.0%) were unemployed.
