= Ghella (company) =

International tunnel construction company

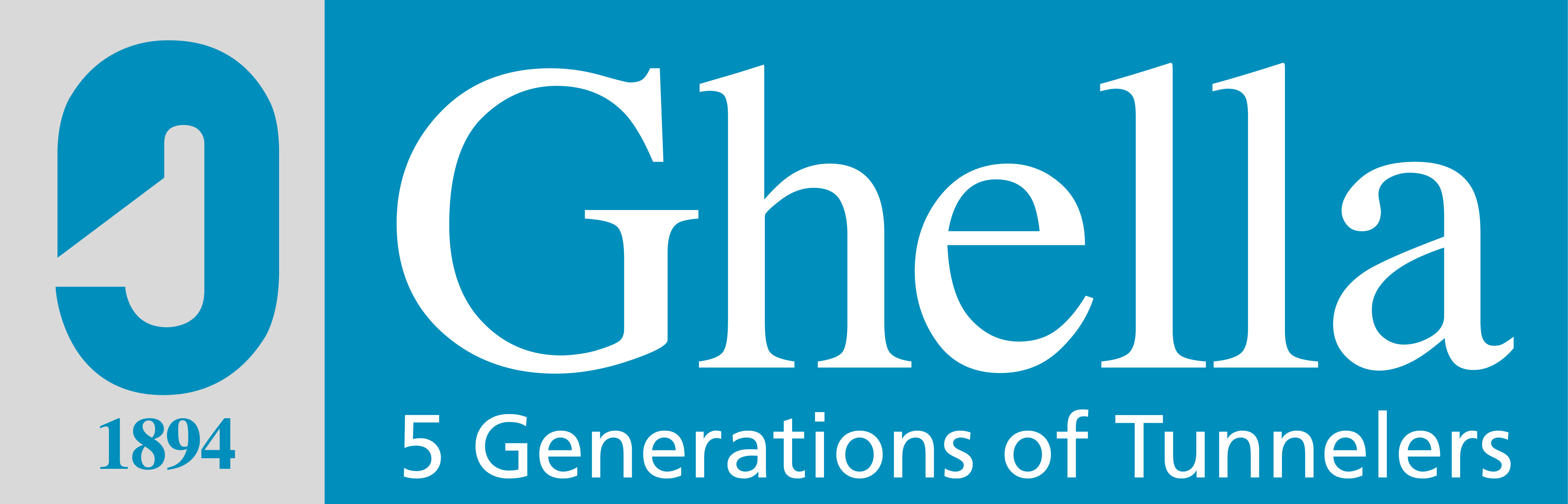
- Company type: Società per Azioni
- Industry: Construction, Engineering
- Founded: 1894
- Headquarters: Rome, Italy
- Key people: Enrico Ghella (President) (CEO); Federico Ghella (Vice president); Lorenzo Ghella (Vice president); Alberto Nigro (Partner) (Member of the Board)
- Products: Infrastructure; Construction of tunnels; Construction of highways
- Website: www.ghella.com

Ghella is an Italian and international civil engineering company, specialized in the construction of large public infrastructural works and underground excavations through the use of tunnel boring machines. The company builds rapid transit systems (subways), railways, highways and hydraulic works. Ghella is also active in the renewable energy sector, with photovoltaic and hydroelectric power generation plants. The company has built, in joint venture with Acciona, the first stage of the Mohammed bin Rashid Al Maktoum Solar Park. Today Ghella employs more than 3.600 people, lives 14 countries and operates in 4 continents, especially in Europe, the Far East, the Americas and Oceania.

== History ==
The company was founded in 1894 by Domenico Ghella. Before this date, Domenico worked as a miner in France, in the construction of the Suez Canal in Egypt, in the funicular tunnel in Istanbul and to build the Trans-siberian railway. Today, the company is led by the fifth generation of the Ghella family.

Ghella has 150 years of experience and builds, for sustainability and with innovation, through the use advanced technologies and cutting-edge construction methods. Over the years it has built more than 130 tunnels and connected over 1000 km of highways, railways and subways around the world.

== Operations ==
=== Major works ===
- Highways and roads
- Dams and hydroelectric power plants
- Railways and subways
- Tunnels

=== Systems for the environment ===
- Wastewater treatment / Sewage systems
- Renewable sources plants

== Major projects ==
=== Completed projects ===
- Legacy Way Project (formerly Northern Link), Brisbane (Australia), 2011-2015
- Mohammed bin Rashid Al Maktoum Solar Park, Dubai (United Arab Emirates) 2017-2020
- Sydney Metro City & Southwest, Sydney (Australia), 2017-2021
- Line 3 (Athens Metro), Athens (Greece), 2011-2022
- Follo Line, Oslo (Norway), 2015-2022

=== Ongoing projects ===
- Brenner Base Tunnel - Metro of Europe, Mules (Italy), 2016
- Cross River Rail, Brisbane (Australia), 2019
- Central Interceptor, Auckland (New Zealand), 2019
- Broadway Subway extension of the Millennium Line, Vancouver (Canada), 2020
- M6 Motorway Sydney, Sydney (Australia), 2021
- Naples–Bari High Speed Railway, Telese-Vitulano (Italy), 2021
- Sydney Metro Western Sydney Airport, Sydney (Australia), 2022
- Turin-Lyon Lot 1 Saint Jean de Maurienne AV, Saint Jean de Maurienne (France), 2022
- Sydney Metro West - Eastern Tunneling Package, Sydney (Australia), 2022

== Other activities ==
The company is involved as partner in the promotion of cultural projects. During the pandemic period, Ghella supported the exhibit and catalog INSIEME, a project conceived by Gianni Politi and promoted by Roma Capitale, Sovrintendenza Capitolina ai Beni Culturali. The exhibit was realized inside the Aurelian Walls to display the works of 19 artists and build a dialogue between monument and contemporary

In 2021, Ghella commissioned a series of photographic campaigns on construction sites in Europe, the Far East and Oceania. The works were collected in the catalog “Di roccia, fuochi e avventure sotterranee” curated by Alessandro Dandini de Sylva and displayed in an exhibit at the MAXXI museum in Rome.

In 2024, Ghella inaugurated a second photography exhibition at the MAXXI – National Museum of 21st Century Arts in Rome, curated by Alessandro Dandini de Sylva, called "Nuove avventure sotterranee" (New Underground Adventures). The artists Stefano Graziani, Rachele Maistrello, Domingo Milella, Luca Nostri, and Giulia Parlato documented the realization of infrastructural works by Ghella across four continents. The result was collected in a publication.

In the same year, Ghella donated the restoration of the Loggia dei Vini in Villa Borghese (Rome), supporting the architectural and artistic conservation of the site. Furthermore, they realized the art program LAVINIA, curated by Salvatore Lacagnina and designed to enhance the space and engage the public through installations by renowned artists.
