= Watchman Island =

Island in New Zealand

Native name: Te Kākāwhakaara
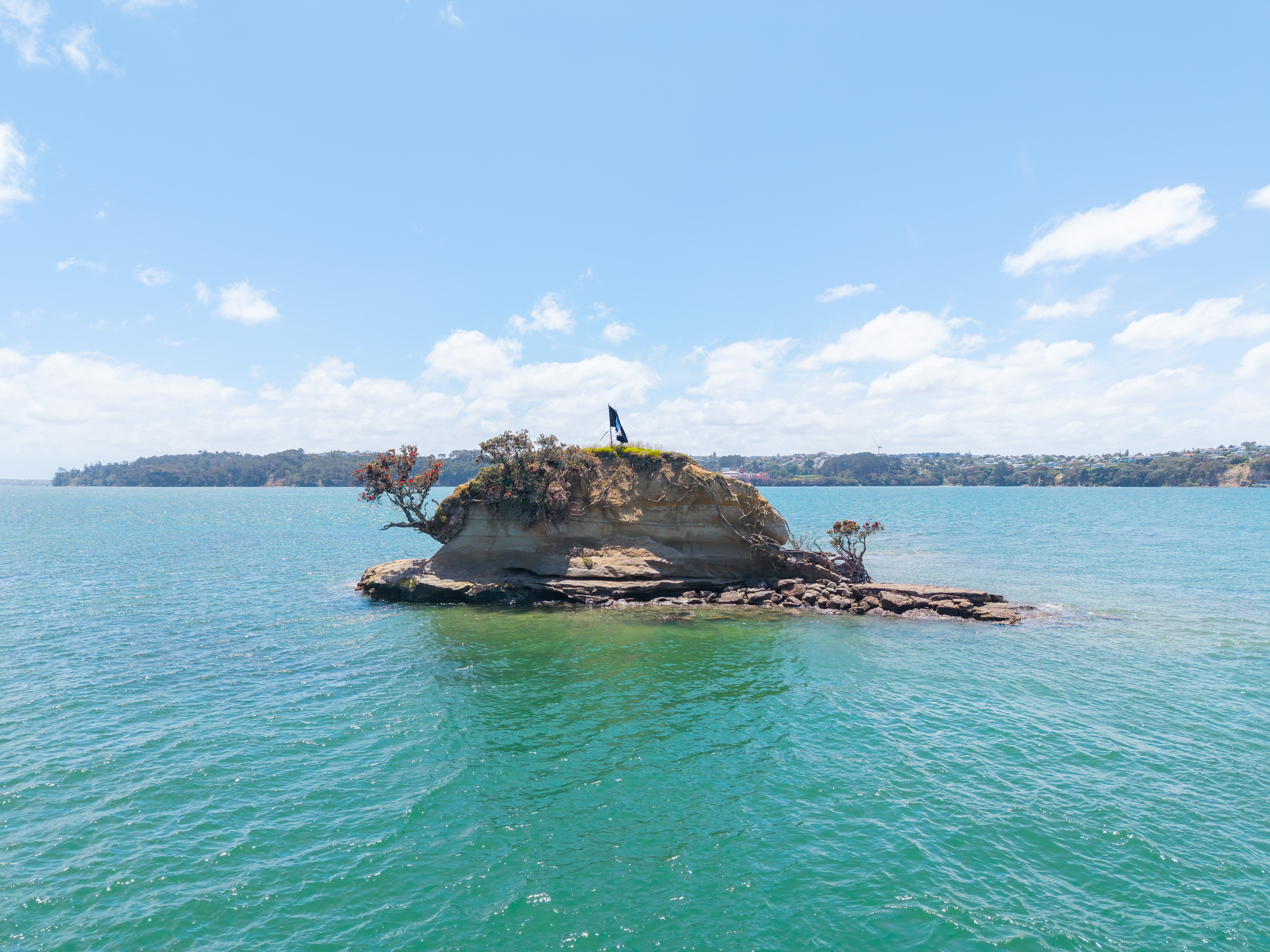
- The island seen from the south-east
- Interactive map of Watchman Island

Geography
- Location: Auckland
- Coordinates: 36°50′06″S 174°43′55″E
- Adjacent to: Waitemata Harbour
- Area: 60 m^{2} (650 sq ft)
- Length: 10 m (30 ft)
- Width: 10 m (30 ft)
- Coastline: 30 m (100 ft)

Administration
- New Zealand

Watchman Island (Te Kākāwhakaara in Māori, officially Watchman Island / Te Kākāwhakaara) is a tiny sandstone island in the Waitematā Harbour of Auckland, New Zealand. It lies approximately 600 metres north of the suburb of Herne Bay.

== History ==
The island is known to Tāmaki Māori iwi as Matungaegae, and was the site of an island pā during the Waiohua confederation (17th and early 18th centuries). Prior to European settlement in the 1840s, the island was much larger in size.

In the mid-19th century, the island was known as Sentinel Rock, which appears under this name on an 1857 British Admiralty chart of the Waitemata Harbour.

The island is visible from the Auckland Harbour Bridge, which caused it to briefly make headlines when Adidas in 2005 erected a metal crouching figure (shown doing a haka) as part of a campaign to promote the All Blacks during the Lions' rugby tour. While Adidas noted that it had consulted on the erection of the statue, it was eventually toppled from the top of the island by a saboteur claiming that it was culturally insensitive. The island is customary Māori property.

The island has special (or more precisely, undefined) legal status, as neither Auckland City Council, Auckland Regional Council or Ports of Auckland claimed responsibility, though some local iwi are considered to have customary rights over it. Auckland Regional Council chairman Mike Lee once noted in a thesis that:

"Watchman Island and many other islets in the Hauraki Gulf "are not formally owned in a property title sense. For nearly 150 years they have existed in a legal limbo as 'uninvestigated', which normally presupposes Māori customary land."

== Gallery ==
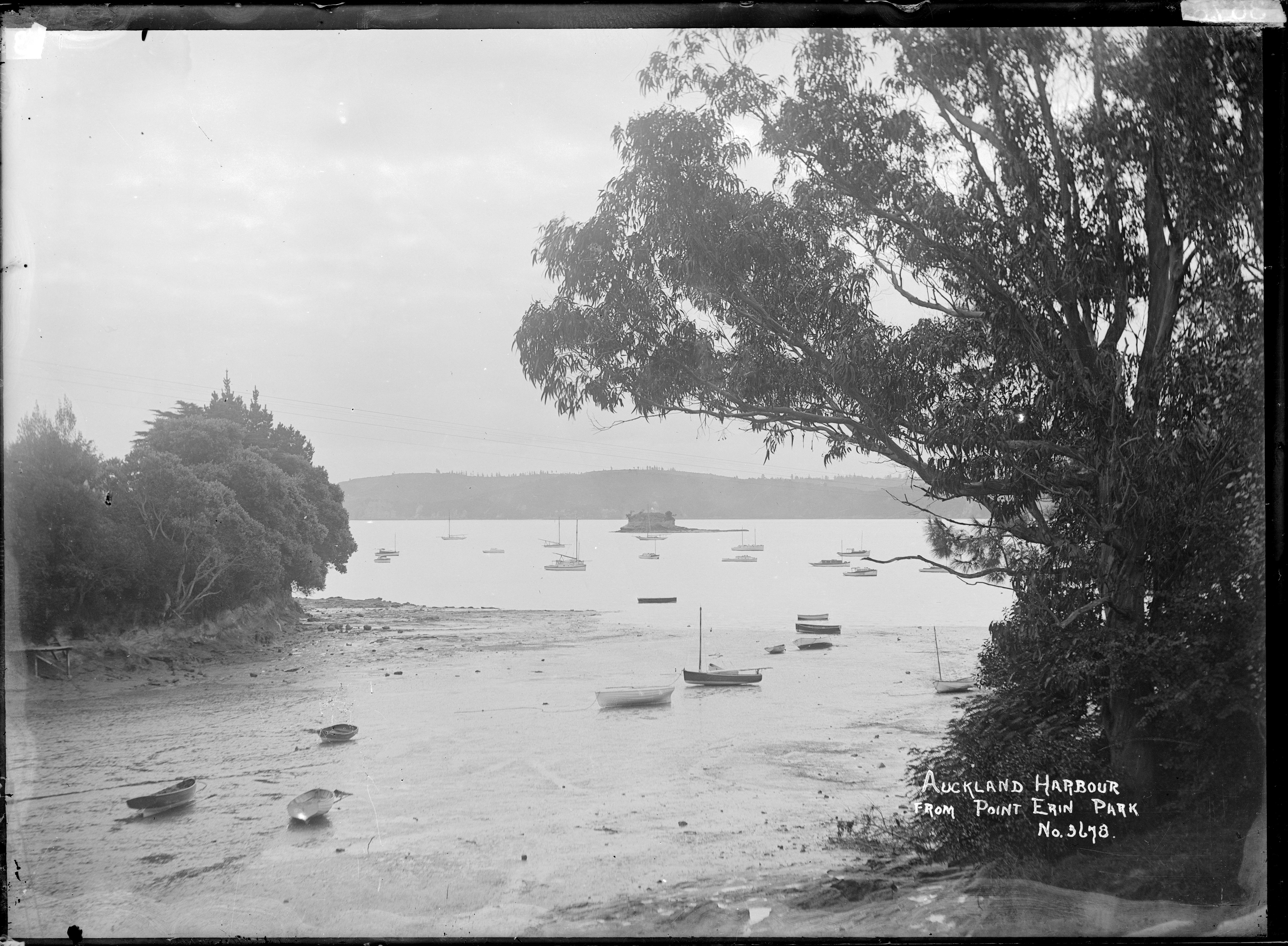
Watchman Island from Point Erin Park in the 1910s.

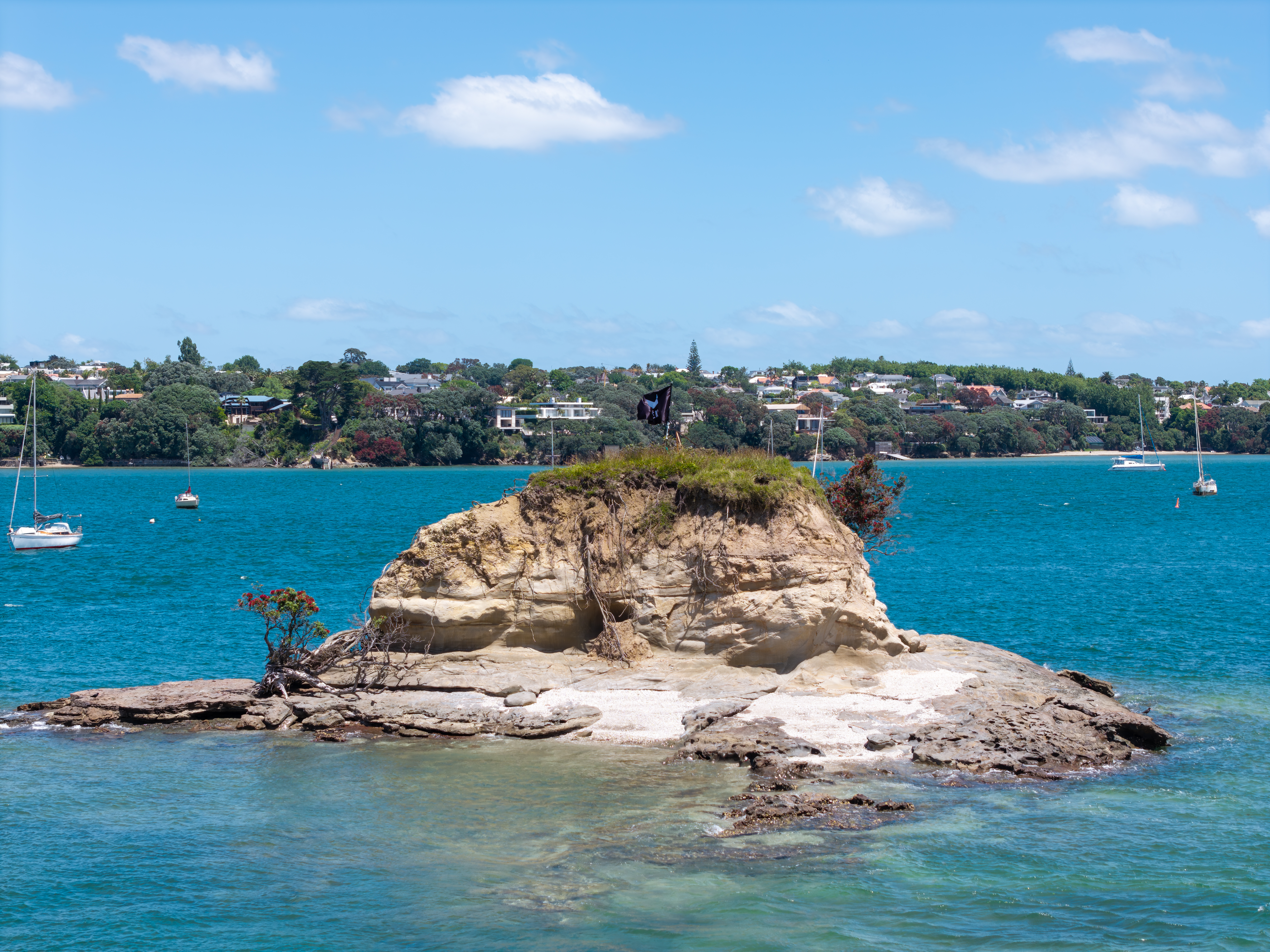
North side of Watchman Island

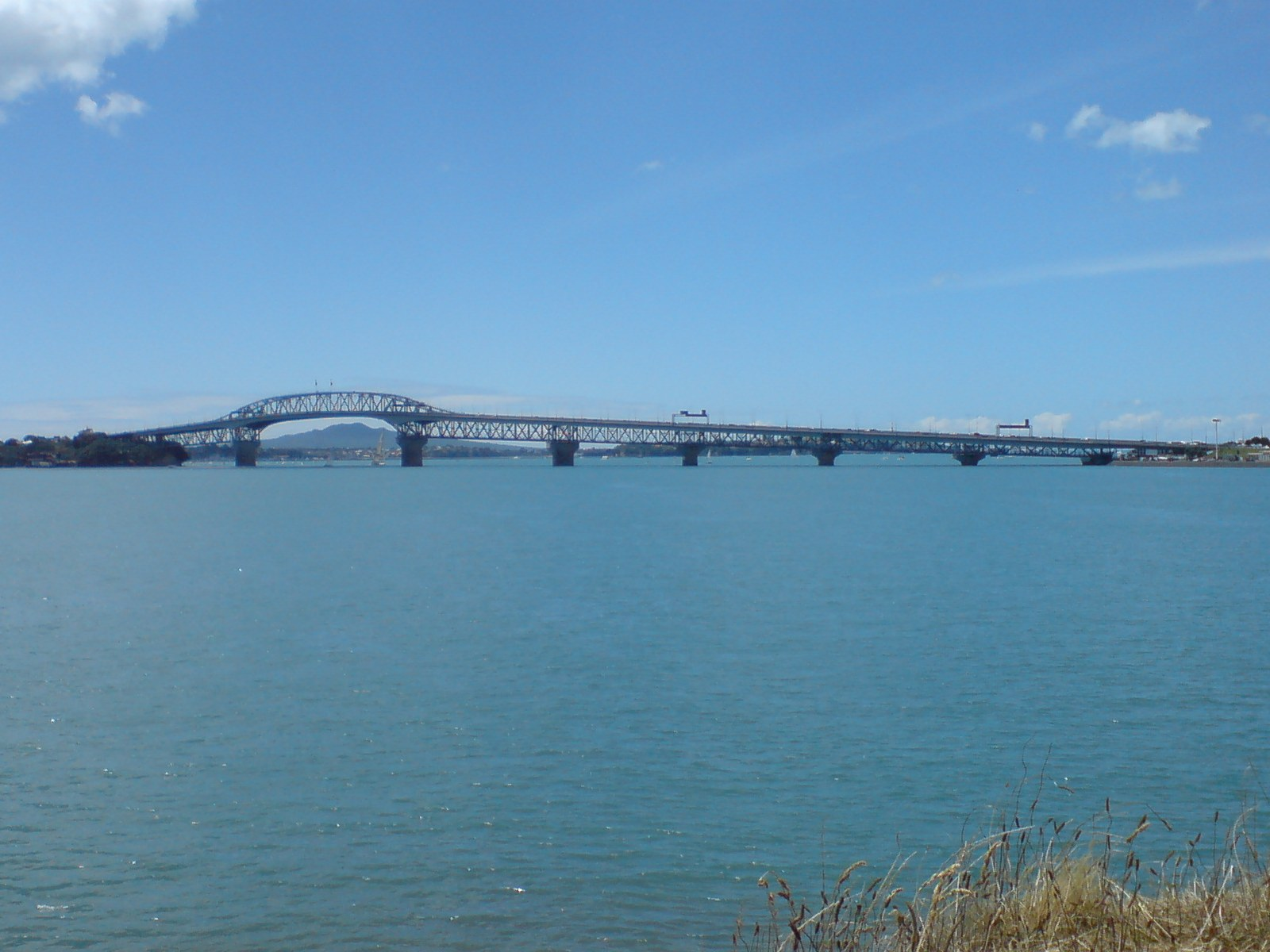
The Auckland Harbour Bridge seen from Watchman Island
