= Central Interceptor =

Sewage infrastructure project in New Zealand

Approximate route

The Central Interceptor is a 4.5 metres (15 ft) diameter wastewater tunnel beneath the central isthmus in Auckland, New Zealand. It carries sewage from parts of the city to the Māngere Wastewater Treatment Plant. The construction of the sewer tunnel began in 2019 and it was in service by mid 2026. The tunnel is described as the backbone of the Auckland sewer system. The project was undertaken by Watercare Services.

== History ==
The interceptor is New Zealand's largest-ever wastewater project, costing approximately $1.5B. The tunnel was initially to run from Western Springs to Māngere, with the length of the tunnel being 13 kilometres (8.1 mi), with an additional 4.3 kilometres (2.7 mi) of link sewers. In 2021, resource consent was granted to extend the project to Tawariki St, Grey Lynn - enabling the new tunnel to connect to the Orakei Sewer Main. In May 2024, resource consent was granted to further extend the tunnel to Point Erin Reserve - giving the tunnel a final length of 16.2 kilometres (10.1 mi). When complete, the interceptor will be New Zealand's third longest tunnel.

The project allows for population growth in Auckland and the resulting increased wastewater demands, and also aims to reduce the volume of overflow from the older combined wastewater/stormwater systems in western Auckland, which dump excess stormwater (contaminated by faeces) into the Waitematā Harbour on days of heavy rain. A notable example on 27 January 2023 resulted in a water quality alert being issued for 11 Auckland beaches because of contaminated stormwater overflows caused by heavy rain. The additional capacity of the central interceptor is expected to reduce these overflows by at least 80%, reducing the number of times per year that contaminated stormwater is dumped into the harbour from 52 days to ten or fewer.

== Construction ==
The construction contract was signed in March 2019 with the Ghella-Abergeldie Joint Venture. Construction was initially expected to run from 2019 to 2024.

Construction will be via a tunnel boring machine. Sixteen access shafts, up to 78 metres (256 ft) deep, will be constructed. The route will take the tunnel 15 metres (49 ft) underneath the Manukau Harbour, although in other areas it will be as much as 110 metres (360 ft) below ground level, due to significant elevation changes on the isthmus. In May 2021, Watercare reported that the project was eight months into what was expected to be a five-year construction period. A 200 metres (660 ft) long tunnel boring machine had been delivered and was being prepared for service, which was gifted a name by local school children: Hiwa-i-te-rangi.
