= Boat Rock =

Native name: Te Nihokiore, Timata
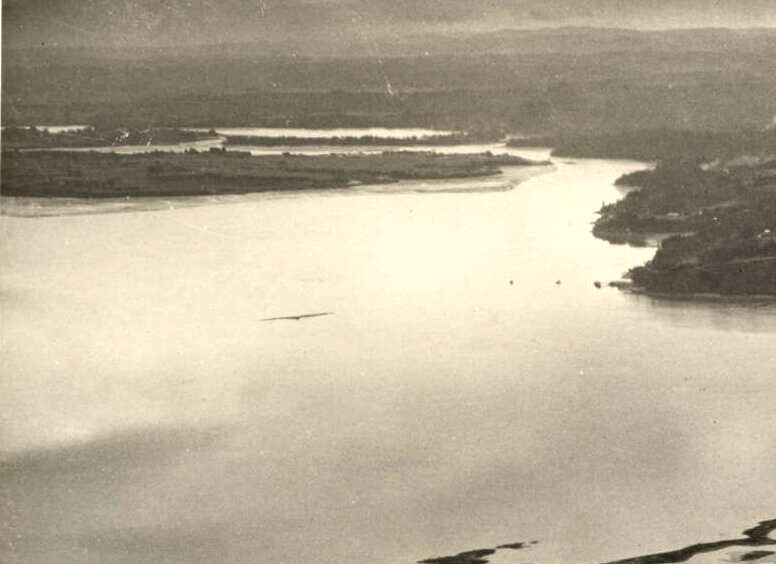
- Boat Rock in the central Waitematā Harbour, pictured in 1946
- Interactive map of Boat Rock

Geography
- Location: Auckland
- Coordinates: 36°49′47″S 174°41′36″E
- Adjacent to: Waitemata Harbour

Administration
- New Zealand

Boat Rock is a tiny sandstone island in the Waitematā Harbour of Auckland, New Zealand. Boat Rock is a vanishing island, which is submerged at high tide.

== Geology ==
The rock is a piece of the Waitemata Group sandstone exposed in the Waitematā Harbour. The rock is an intertidal reef, exposed during low tide. The surface of Boat Rock is covered in sand and shell deposits.

Boat Rock is home to a number of species including sea slugs such as Dendrodoris citrina, Dendrodoris nigra and Pleurobranchaea maculata, sea snails such as Maoricolpus roseus and Dicathais orbita. In addition, the island is home to kina and a species of chiton, Cryptoconchus porosus.

== History ==
The island was traditionally referred to by Tāmaki Māori iwi by various names, including Te Nihokiore ("The Rat's Tooth"), Timata, Te-Toka-tu-Moana ("The Rock Standing in Mid-Sea"), Te-Waka-o-Tawaroa and Te Mata-o-Kahu. Te Nihokiore is likely a metaphor for how the rocks remain sharp despite being battered by the sea, similar to a rat's tooth. The island is the namesake of the Waitematā Harbour, which literally means "Waters of Te Mata". The name refers to Te Arawa chief Kahumatamomoe, who when visiting the harbour placed a mauri stone (a stone of religious significance) on Boat Rock. The name Waitematā originally only referred to the upper harbour area near Boat Rock. Boat Rock was traditionally used as a rohe marker, designating the boundary of influence between different Tāmaki Māori iwi.

The waters surrounding Boat Rock were a traditional fishery, known by the name Waipokanoa ("The Waters of Foolishness").

In 1873, an iron ship beacon was erected on the island, which was damaged by ships in 1905.
