= Kauri Point Armament Depot =

New Zealand defence storage facility near Auckland

Defence Armament Depot
- Chatswood, New Zealand
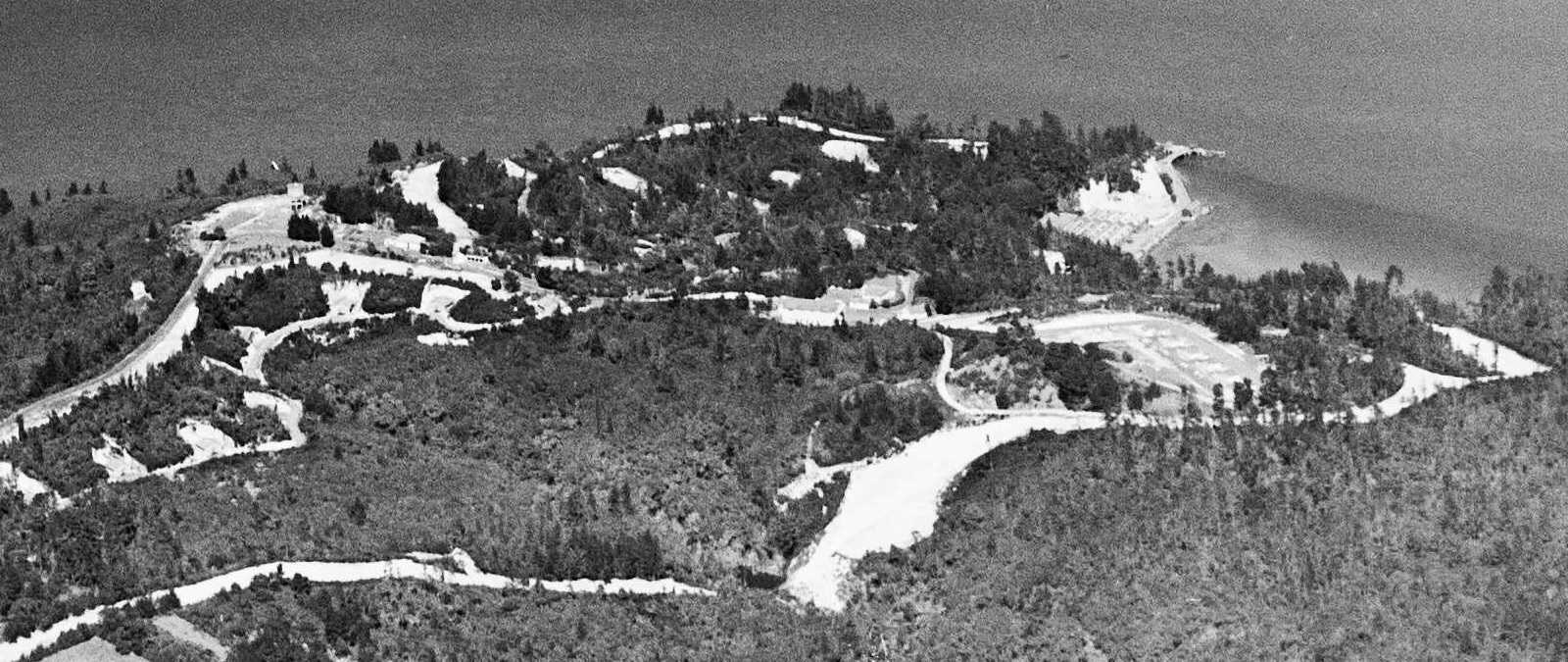
- Kauri Point Armament Depot in 1957

Site information
- Operator: Defence Logistics Command

Location
- Coordinates: 36°49′15″S 174°42′07″E

Site history
- In use: 1937–present

The Defence Armament Depot, named the Kauri Point Armament Depot until 2010, is a New Zealand Defence Force munitions storage facility in the Auckland suburb of Chatswood which was originally built for the Royal New Zealand Navy. The Depot has access to Waitematā Harbour. The armament depot was established in 1935, and was considerably expanded during the Second World War. A programme to modernise the facility was announced in 2011.

== History ==
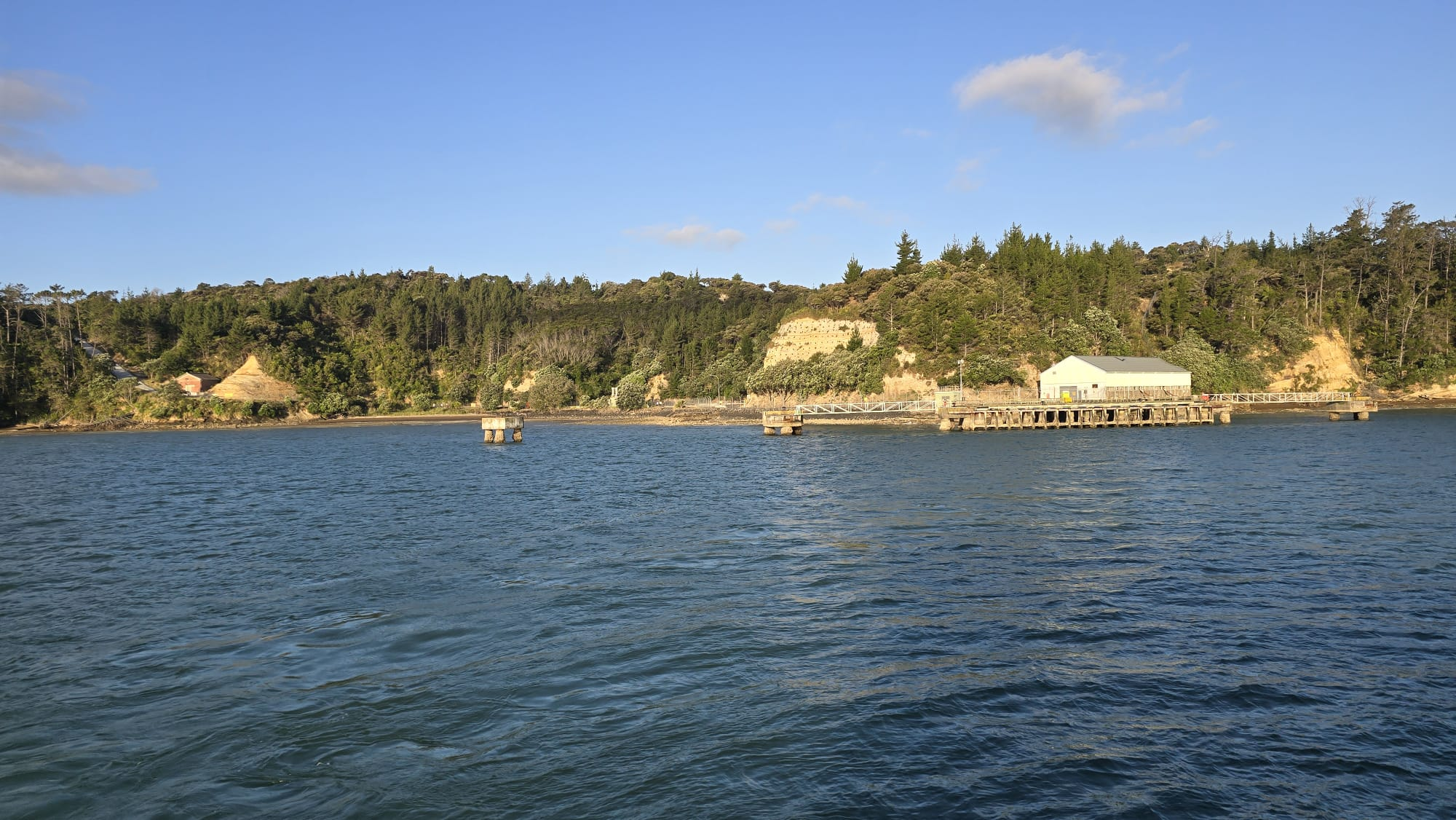
The Kauri Point Armament Depot Onetaunga Bay jetty

The Kauri Point Armament Depot was established during the 1930s to replace armaments stores located in Narrow Neck. Work began on the site on 7 October 1935, and munitions began to be transferred to it from Narrow Neck in August 1937.

The Armament Depot was expanded during the early years of the Second World War, and part of the site was taken over by the United States Navy in 1942. The US Navy added a further sixteen buildings to the depot before withdrawing from it in 1944; as of this time the depot comprised 58 permanent and temporary buildings. The facility was primarily used to store munitions during the Second World War, and did not have the maintenance function which armament depots typically undertake. Following the Second World War large quantities of ammunition were stored at Kauri Point. During the 1950s and 1960s the site was used to prepare ammunition to be dumped into the Hauraki Gulf.

The Kauri Point Armament Depot's role was expanded in the 1950s when it gained maintenance functions, which included repairs to guns from RNZN warships, torpedo maintenance and scientific tests on explosives. In the 1960s new facilities were built to store guided missiles and anti-submarine torpedoes. Unneeded buildings began to be demolished in the 1970s.

As of 2008, the Kauri Point Armament Depot was the main port used to receive bulk ammunition shipments for the New Zealand Defence Force. A report released that year stated that most of the site's ammunition storage facilities were in poor condition. Leaks in the roof of one of the buildings caused $121,000 worth of ammunition to be written off after being damaged by water. At this time $NZ155 million worth of ammunition was stored at Kauri Point, with all but five of its 120 explosives storehouses having been built before or during the Second World War. A long term plan was in place to replace these storehouses with new facilities.

The Kauri Point Armament Depot was assigned to the Defence Logistics Command on 1 July 2010, and renamed the Defence Armament Depot.

In late July 2011, a man entered the Defence Armament Depot during a weekend and stole ammunition and flares. While the site had a 24-hour security presence, the theft was not noticed until the following Monday. The ammunition was later recovered, and in August 2011 the New Zealand Government announced that it would spend $NZ 7 million to build modern ammunition bunkers at Kauri Point and upgrade the site's security.

In May 2024 the frigate HMNZS Te Kaha suffered minor damage to its bow when it collided with the wharf at Kauri Point Armament Depot. The damage to the ship cost $NZ220,000 to repair.
