= Chatswood, New Zealand =

Chatswood
- Suburb
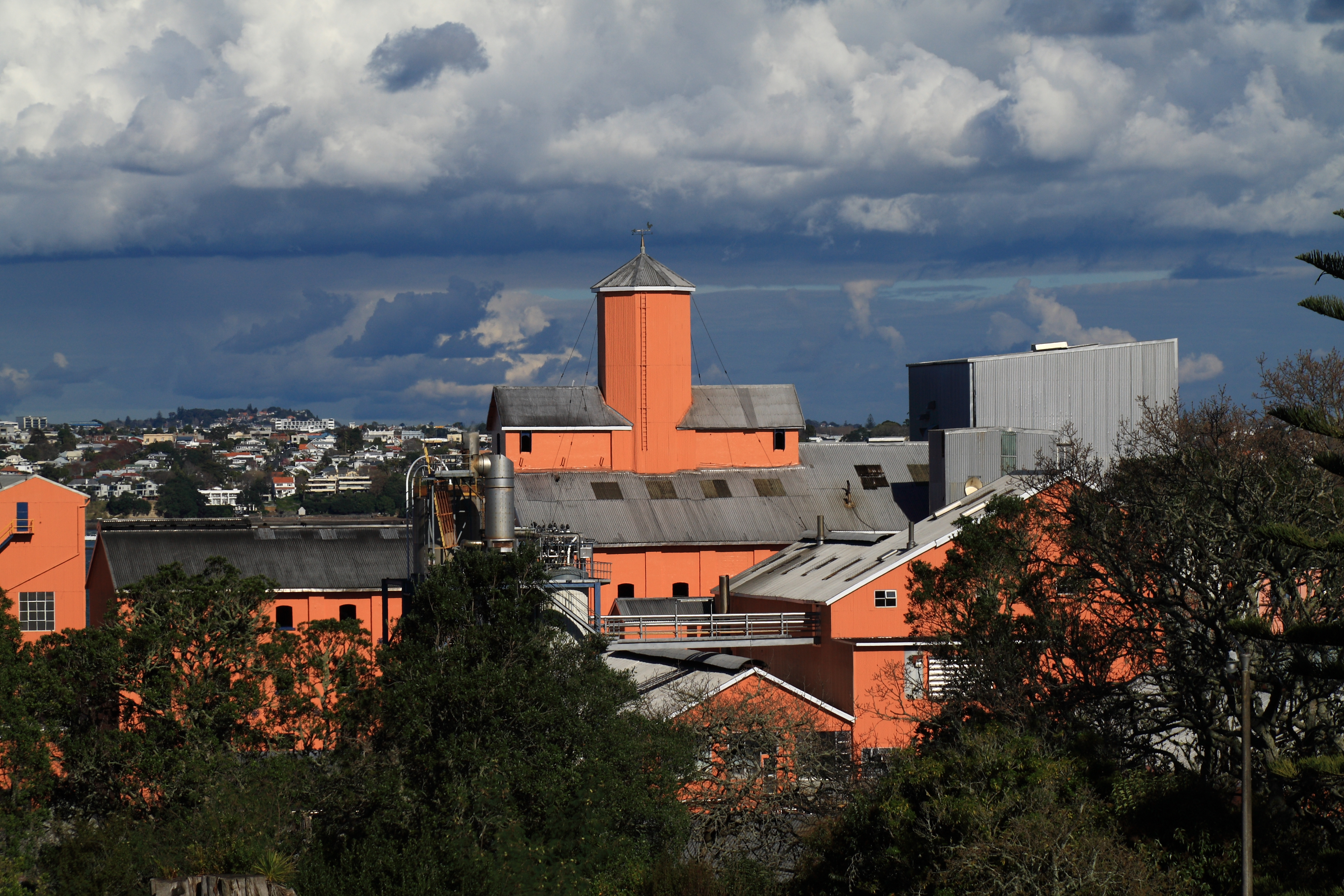
- The Chelsea Sugar Refinery and suburban Chatswood in the background
- Interactive map of Chatswood
- Coordinates: 36.8159°S 174.7157°E
- Country: New Zealand
- City: Auckland
- Local authority: Auckland Council
- Electoral ward: North Shore ward
- Local board: Kaipatiki Local Board

Area
  - Land: 307 ha (760 acres)

Population (June 2025)
  - Total: 3,690
  - Density: 1,200/km^{2} (3,110/sq mi)
- Postcode: 0626

| Beach Haven | Birkenhead | Birkenhead |
| (Waitematā Harbour) | Chatswood | Birkenhead |
| (Waitematā Harbour) | (Waitematā Harbour) | (Waitematā Harbour) |

Chatswood is a suburb in the city of Auckland, New Zealand, in the middle-eastern side of the North Shore. It contains a primary school and many parks. To the south of Chatswood is Kendall's Bay, a small bay of the Waitematā Harbour. The suburb is under the governance of Auckland Council. The Royal New Zealand Navy's Kauri Point Armament Depot is located in Chatswood. Chelsea Sugar Refinery is located in Chatswood.

== Etymology ==
The name Chatswood was decided by property developers in 1973. In the latter 19th century, the sparsely populated area near Kauri Point was often referred to as Balmain.

== Geography ==
The Chatswood area is primarily uplifted Waitemata Group sandstone, that was deposited on the sea floor during the Early Miocene, between 22 and 16 million years ago. Prior to human settlement, the inland North Shore was a mixed podocarp-broadleaf forest dominated by kauri and other conifer trees. Pōhutukawa trees dominated the coastal margins of Birkenhead. Some kauri remnant forest remains in areas around Chatswood, including Kauri Park, Le Roys Bush, Kauri Point Domain, Kauri Glen and Eskdale Reserve.

Duck Creek is a stream that flows south south-east through Chatswood, entering the Waitematā Harbour near the Chelsea Sugar Refinery. A number of bays of the Waitematā Harbour can be found around Chatswood including (clockwise from right): Chelsea Bay, Kendall Bay, Onetaunga Bay, Fitzpatrick Bay, and Soldiers Bay.

The highest in the suburb is 100 metres (330 ft) above sea-level, located on Onetaunga Road north of Bragato Place. The southernmost point of the suburb is Kauri Point Birkenhead / Te Mātā-rae-o-Mana.

== History ==
=== Māori history ===
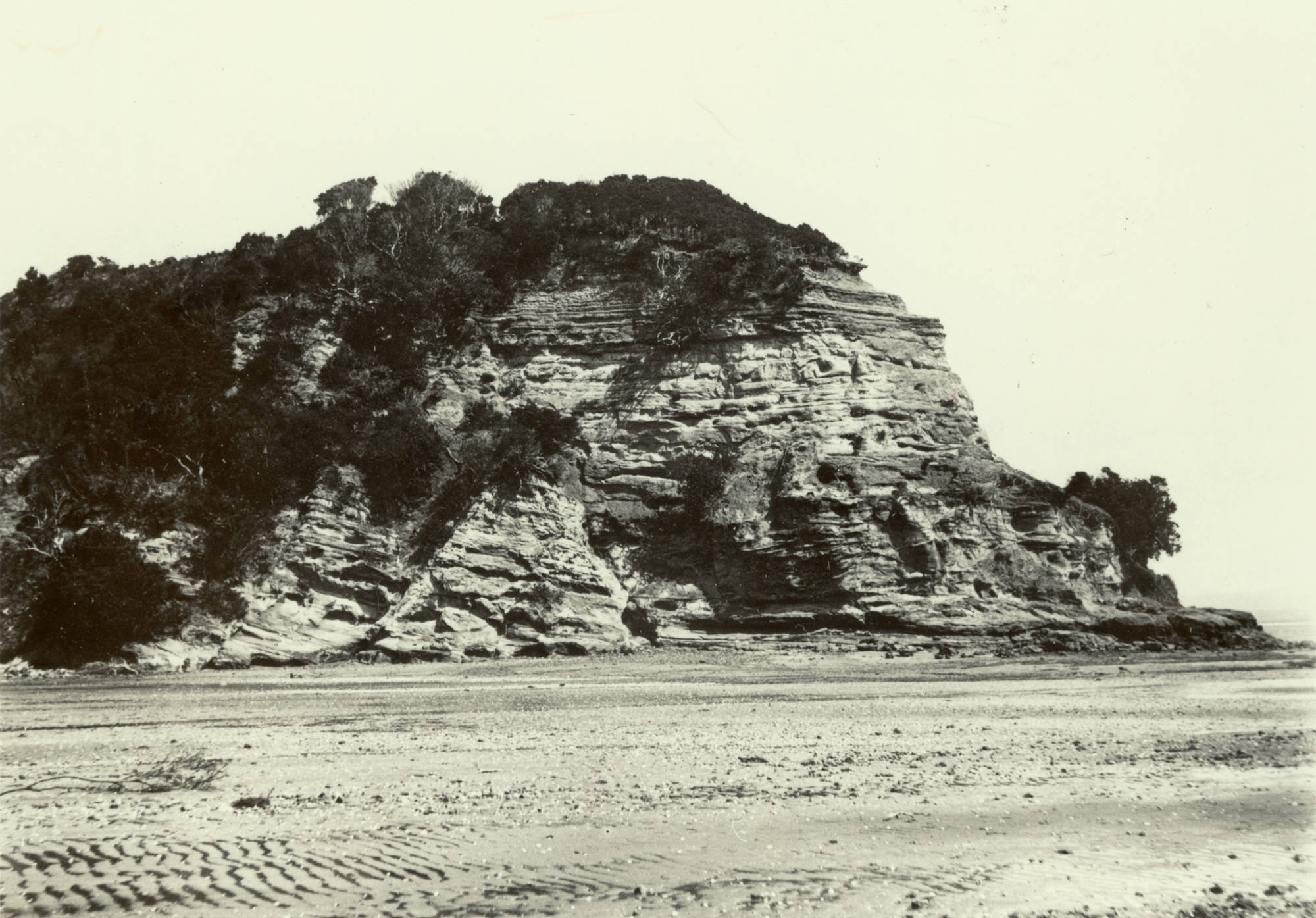
Kauri Point was the location of Te Mātārae ō Mana ("The Brow of Mana"), a Te Kawerau ā Maki pā overlooking the Waitematā Harbour and close to an important shark fishery

The poor clay soils of the inland forest of the hindered development. Most Māori settlements of the Birkenhead area focused on fishing and harvesting food from the forests. The focal point of Te Kawerau ā Maki on the North Shore was Te Mātārae ō Mana ("The Brow of Mana"), a headland pā at Kauri Point.

=== Early European settlement ===
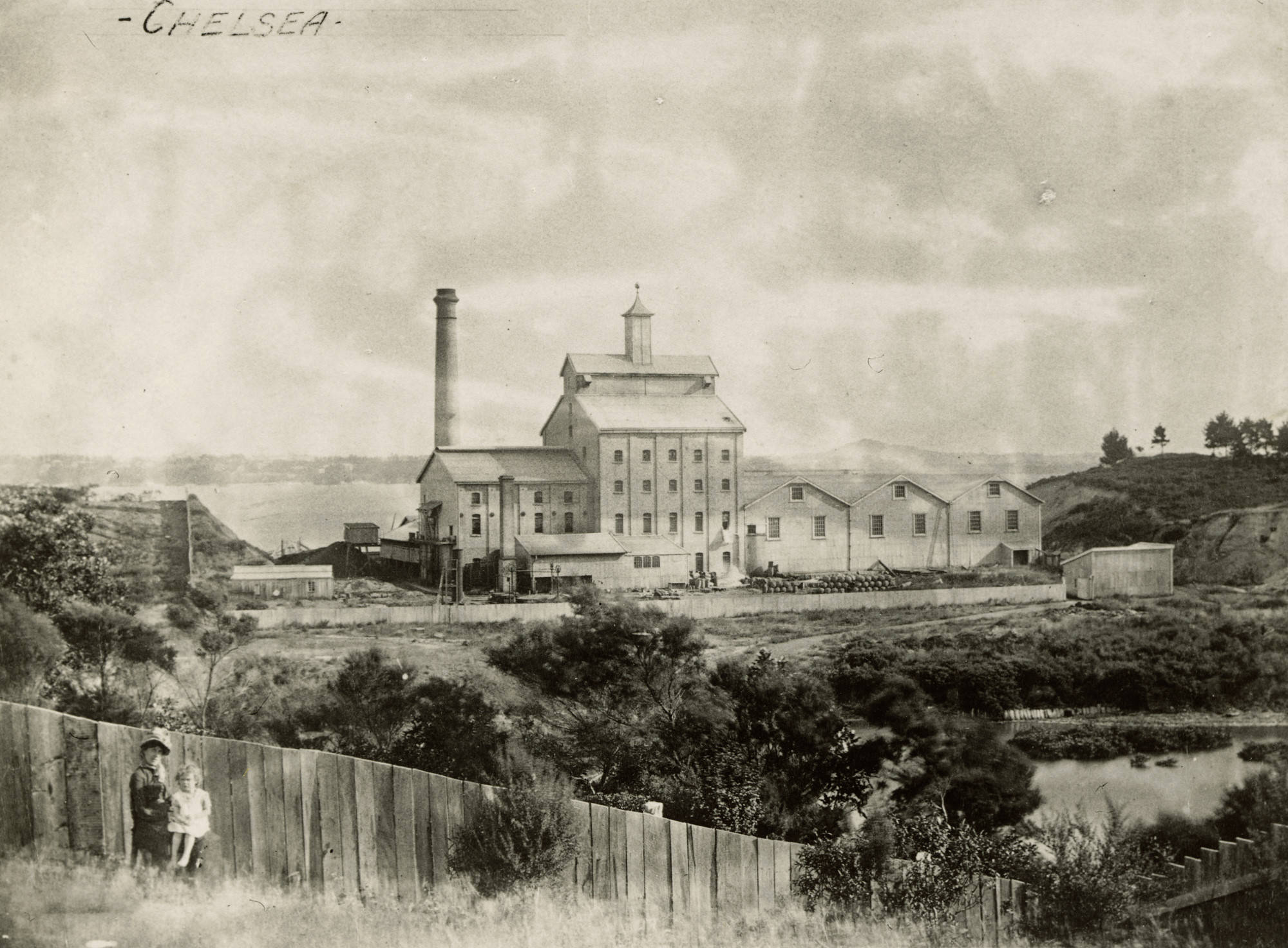
The Chelsea Sugar Refinery in 1885

The area Chatswood was a part of the Mahurangi Block, an area purchased by the Crown on 13 April 1841. Land speculators purchased much of the isolated forests of Birkenhead in 1843, and the first permanent settlers arrived in 1849. Major Collings Ann de Jersey Grut emigrated to New Zealand in the 1850s from the Channel Islands, alongside her husband Major Collings de Jersey Grut and brother Charles D'Auvergne. The de Jersey Grut family established a farm and manor near Duck Creek in the 1850s, but struggled to establish a farm. The poor soil led to starvation, and the servants needing to share food with the de Jersey Grut family members, and cattle would often wander off into the bush. The de Jersey Grut family left in 1865, and had their house shipped to Orewa. Birkenhead was subdivided and promoted as a township from 1863, and in 1882 Auckland Harbour Board constructed the Birkenhead Wharf.

Around the year 1866, Walter Carnall established a brickworks at Kauri Point.

In 1881, the Australasian Colonial Sugar Refining Company chose Birkenhead for the site of a new sugar refining factory, after founder Edward Knox visited Auckland. The refinery was chosen due to Auckland's relative proximity to the sugarcane plantations of Fiji, and south-eastern Birkenhead was chosen as it was one of the few deep water anchorages of the Waitematā Harbour, and due to its proximity to the fresh water Duck Creek. The factory opened in 1884, and by 1888 had greatly increased production. The factory continues to be the largest single site industrial facility on the North Shore.

The establishment of Chelsea Sugar Refinery led to a population explosion in Birkenhead and the surrounding areas, and led to Birkenhead developing into a suburban township. In the mid-1880s, a factory village was constructed adjacent for workers at the factory. Mr Judd, the first customs officer, successfully convinced the Colonial Sugar Refining Company to call both the factory and adjacent company village Chelsea, after his hometown in England. In 1938 on the eve of World War II, the New Zealand Government established the Kauri Point Armament Depot.

=== Suburban development ===
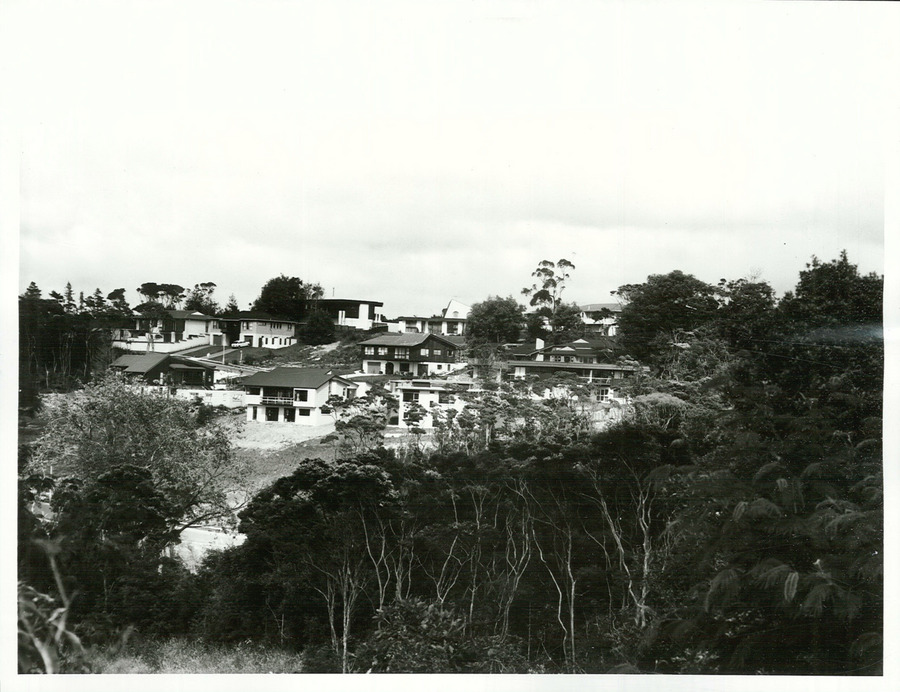
Chatswood, seen soon after its construction (photographed in 1975).

In the 1950s, Birkenhead Borough was a semi-rural area of Auckland, with only the areas close to the Birkenhead Wharf having a suburban atmosphere. In 1959, the Auckland Harbour Bridge opened, which rapidly brought Birkenhead closer to Auckland. The North Shore wharves of the Waitematā Harbour stopped being major transport nodes, and instead, areas with views of the Waitematā Harbour rose in importance for suburban housing.

Chatswood was developed in 1966, on surplus land no longer needed by Chelsea Sugar Refinery. The suburb was the largest and most expensive of the Birkenhead Borough suburbs that developed after the construction of the bridge. The Chatswood Estate was sold to residents from 1973 onwards.

In 1986, the Kauri Point Centennial Park was created to mark 100 years since the creation of the Birkenhead Borough Council.

== Demographics ==
Chatswood covers 3.07 km^{2} (1.19 sq mi) and had an estimated population of 3,690 as of June 2025, with a population density of 1,202 people per km^{2}.

Historical population
| Year | Pop. | ±% p.a. |
|---|---|---|
| 2006 | 3,426 | — |
| 2013 | 3,402 | −0.10% |
| 2018 | 3,531 | +0.75% |
| 2023 | 3,438 | −0.53% |

Chatswood had a population of 3,438 in the 2023 New Zealand census, a decrease of 93 people (−2.6%) since the 2018 census, and an increase of 36 people (1.1%) since the 2013 census. There were 1,731 males, 1,701 females and 3 people of other genders in 1,116 dwellings. 2.7% of people identified as LGBTIQ+. The median age was 40.7 years (compared with 38.1 years nationally). There were 612 people (17.8%) aged under 15 years, 612 (17.8%) aged 15 to 29, 1,623 (47.2%) aged 30 to 64, and 591 (17.2%) aged 65 or older.

People could identify as more than one ethnicity. The results were 60.2% European (Pākehā); 6.1% Māori; 2.5% Pasifika; 35.3% Asian; 3.4% Middle Eastern, Latin American and African New Zealanders (MELAA); and 2.8% other, which includes people giving their ethnicity as "New Zealander". English was spoken by 92.2%, Māori language by 1.0%, Samoan by 0.2%, and other languages by 32.8%. No language could be spoken by 1.7% (e.g. too young to talk). New Zealand Sign Language was known by 0.3%. The percentage of people born overseas was 47.0, compared with 28.8% nationally.

Religious affiliations were 28.9% Christian, 2.3% Hindu, 0.8% Islam, 1.5% Buddhist, 0.3% New Age, 0.1% Jewish, and 1.3% other religions. People who answered that they had no religion were 58.6%, and 6.3% of people did not answer the census question.

Of those at least 15 years old, 1,206 (42.7%) people had a bachelor's or higher degree, 1,077 (38.1%) had a post-high school certificate or diploma, and 543 (19.2%) people exclusively held high school qualifications. The median income was $51,200, compared with $41,500 nationally. 633 people (22.4%) earned over $100,000 compared to 12.1% nationally. The employment status of those at least 15 was that 1,488 (52.7%) people were employed full-time, 381 (13.5%) were part-time, and 66 (2.3%) were unemployed.

== Local government ==
The first local government in the area was the North Shore Highway District, which began operating in 1868 and administered roading and similar projects across the North Shore. From 1876, Chatswood was also a part of the Takapuna Riding of Waitemata County; a large rural county north and west of the city of Auckland. In 1884 the Birkenhead Road District split from the North Shore Highway District.

On 12 April 1888, with only 330 ratepayers the Birkenhead Road District became the Borough of Birkenhead, one of the earliest boroughs of Auckland. The borough had a mayor and a local council, and was able to make more decisions on how to invest in the area. After 90 years due to major growth in the mid-20th century, Birkenhead became a city on 15 March 1978, with a population of 20,000 people. In 1989, Chatswood and Birkenhead were merged into the North Shore City. North Shore City was amalgamated into Auckland Council in November 2010.

Within the Auckland Council, Chatswood is a part of the Kaipātiki local government area governed by the Kaipātiki Local Board. It is a part of the North Shore ward, which elects two councillors to the Auckland Council.

== Amenities ==
The Chatswood area is home to a number of forested reserves, including Kauri Park, Centennial Park and Chatswood Reserve.

== Education ==
Chelsea School is a coeducational contributing primary (years 1-6) school with a roll of 384 as of July 2026. It was built in 1981.

== Bibliography ==
- McClure, Margaret (1987). The Story of Birkenhead. Birkenhead City Council. ISBN 0-908704-04-6. OL 33998949W. Wikidata Q120679112.
- Verran, David (2010), The North Shore: An Illustrated History, North Shore: Random House, OL 33434370W, Wikidata Q120520385
