= Crystal Palace =

Crystal Palace most famously refers to The Crystal Palace built in 1851 for the Great Exhibition in Hyde Park, London. After the exhibition it was moved to the outskirts of the city, in an area subsequently renamed Crystal Palace, London, and destroyed by fire in 1936. Other uses of the name include:

== Places ==
=== Canada ===
- Crystal Palace Complex (Dieppe), a shopping complex in Dieppe, New Brunswick
  - Crystal Palace Amusement Park, a former amusement park inside the Crystal Palace Complex in New Brunswick
- Crystal Palace Barracks, London, Ontario
- Crystal Palace (Montreal), an exhibition building
- Crystal Palace, Toronto, a former exhibit building at Exhibition Place

=== Germany ===
- Glaspalast (Munich), a German building resembling the British building
- Glaspalast Sindelfingen, an indoor sporting arena in Germany

=== Italy ===
- Crystal Palace (Brescia)

=== United Kingdom ===
- The Crystal Palace, built in 1851 originally in Hyde Park, then relocated to south London in 1854 and destroyed by fire in 1936
  - The Great Exhibition, the event the building was built for, sometimes also known as the Crystal Palace Exhibition
  - Crystal Palace School, set up by the Crystal Palace Company in 1853
- Crystal Palace, London, a residential area within several boroughs in south London around the location of the former Crystal Palace building
- Crystal Palace Park, the grounds to which the Crystal Palace Exhibition building was relocated
  - Crystal Palace circuit, former motor racing track within the park
- Crystal Palace, York, a listed public house
- Crystal Palace transmitting station, in the London Borough of Bromley
- Crystal Palace railway station, in the London Borough of Bromley
- Crystal Palace National Sports Centre, in the London Borough of Bromley
- Crystal Palace (High Level) railway station, a defunct station in the London Borough of Southwark
- Crystal Palace (ward), in the London Borough of Bromley

=== United States ===
- New York Crystal Palace, an 1853 exhibition building
- Buck Owens Crystal Palace night club, museum, and restaurant in Bakersfield, California
- Pythian Castle Lodge, Milwaukee, Wisconsin, also known as "Crystal Palace"
- Crystal Palace, former code name for Cheyenne Mountain Operations Center, a United States military base.

=== Other places ===
- Crystal Palace, a building in Petrópolis, Brazil
- Palacio de Cristal del Retiro, Madrid, Spain
- Crystal Palace (Ljubljana), a skyscraper in Slovenia
- Rokumeikan, a former pavilion in Tokyo, Japan, often called "Crystal Palace" in English
- Crystal Palace Theatre, Auckland, a movie theatre in New Zealand
- Crystal Palace, Christchurch, a former movie theatre in New Zealand

== Sport ==
- Crystal Palace F.C., a professional football club based in Selhurst, South London
- Crystal Palace F.C. (Women), a women's football club based in South London
- Crystal Palace F.C. (1861), a defunct amateur football club formed in 1861
- Crystal Palace Baltimore, previously Crystal Palace F.C. USA, a former professional soccer team in Maryland, US
- Crystal Palace circuit, a former motor racing circuit in Crystal Palace Park
- Crystal Palace (basketball), a former British Basketball League team
- Crystal Palace National Sports Centre, the national sports centre and athletics stadium situated inside the Crystal Palace park
- Crystal Palace Glaziers, a defunct speedway team that raced from 1928 to 1939

== Fiction ==
- Crystal Palace, a space station in the online game Entropia Universe
- Crystal Palace, a place in the game Paper Mario
- Crystal Palace (board game), concerning the 1851 Great Exhibition
- The Crystal Palace (novel), by Phyllis Eisenstein
- Crystal Palace, a character in Dead Boy Detectives.
- Crystal Palace (film), 1934 Soviet Ukrainian film

== Other uses ==
- Crystal Palace (horse), a racehorse
- Crystal Palace Concerts, held from 1855 until 1901

== See also ==
- Crystal Palace pneumatic railway, a 19th-century experimental railway
- 1909 Crystal Palace Scout Rally, a Boy Scout rally held in 1909
- Crystal Cathedral, a church in Garden Grove, California, US
- Crystal Castles (disambiguation)
- Glass Palace (disambiguation)
  - Glaspaleis, a former fashion house and department store in Heerlen, The Netherlands
