= Symonds St Public Conveniences and Shelter =

Category 2 listed historic place in Auckland, New Zealand

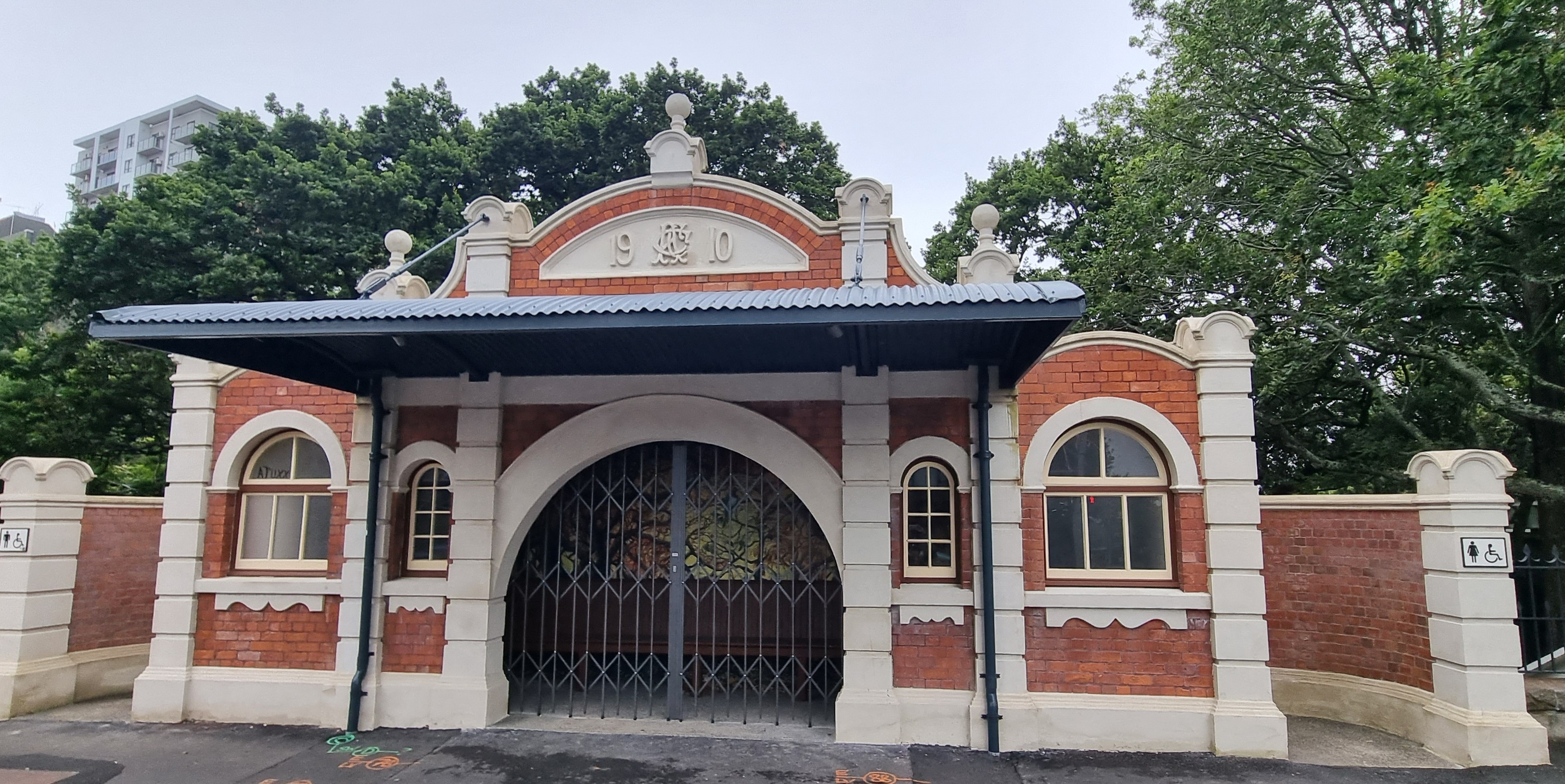
- Conveniences and Shelter after restoration in 2022
- Interactive map of the Symonds St Public Conveniences and Shelter area

General information
- Architectural style: Edwardian Baroque
- Location: Corner of Symonds Street and Grafton Bridge, Auckland, New Zealand
- Coordinates: 36°51′29.9″S 174°45′49.9″E
- Opened: 1910

Design and construction
- Architect: Walter Ernest Bush

Heritage New Zealand – Category 2
- Designated: 11 November 1981
- Reference no.: 561

Symonds St Public Conveniences and Former Tram Shelter is a category 2 historic place in Auckland, New Zealand, and included the first standalone street toilets in Auckland to cater to both men and women. The toilets were later converted into a male-only facility during the Second World War, the women's facilities being reopened in 2000.

== History ==
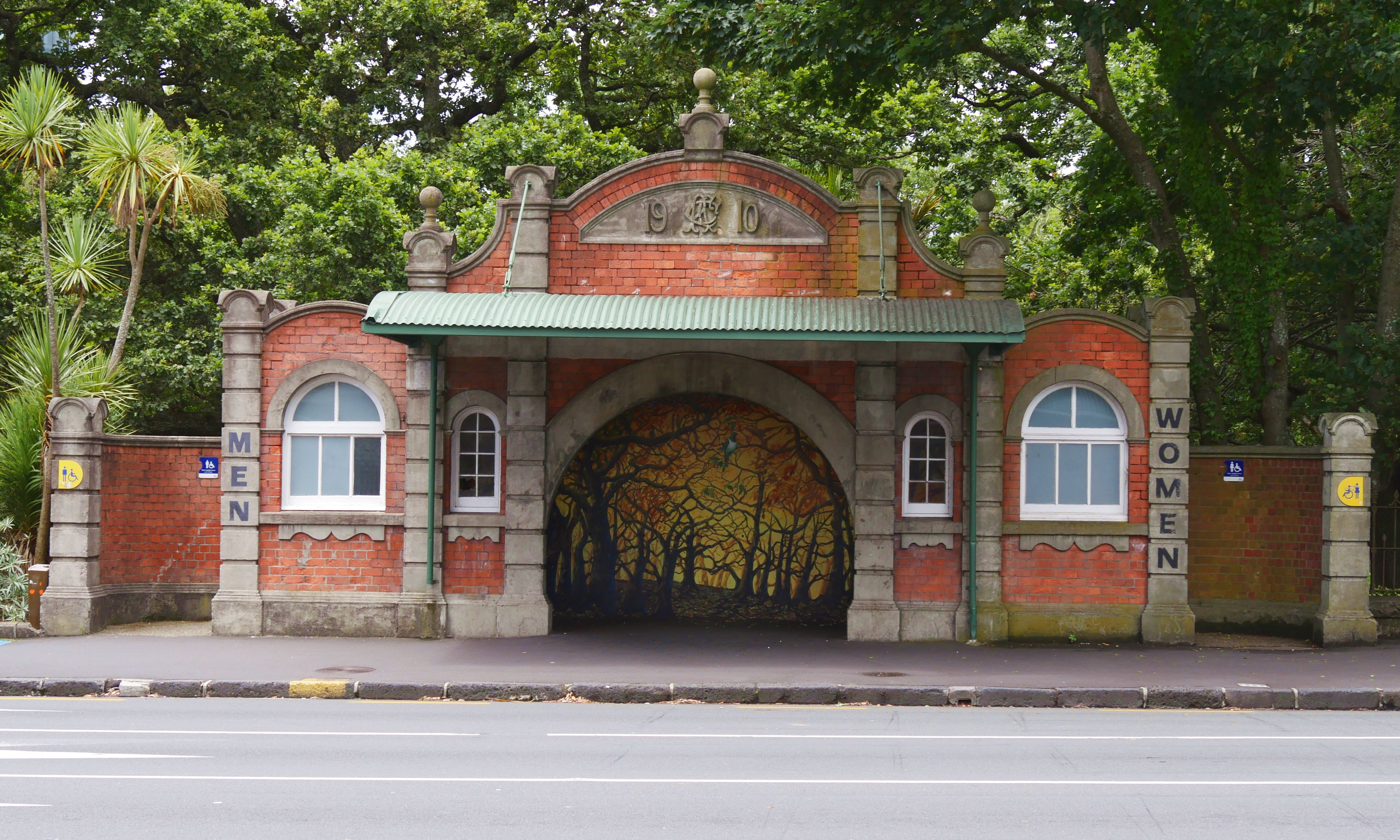
Shelter before restoration

In April 1910, the Public Conveniences and Former Tram Shelter was opened on the corner of Symonds Street and Grafton Bridge. This coincided with the building and opening of Grafton Bridge.

Following Auckland's branch of the Women's Political League pushing for urban public toilets for women, they were the first standalone street toilets in Auckland to cater to both men and women. Previously the closest toilets with access for women were at the public libraries and Smith & Caughey's department store.

The structure incorporated a tram shelter, that from 1956 was used as a bus shelter when the trams were discontinued. To offer greater privacy to women, the access to the women's toilet was from inside the shelter, but this was altered in the 1920s to have an external access like the men's toilets as the shelter was frequently in use, including purposes that were unanticipated such as rough sleeping.

During the Second World War, the toilets were converted into being a male-only facility. In 2000, the women's toilets were re-installed.

In 2020–2022, a major conservation project costing NZ$910,000 worked to reinstate many of the earlier features of the structure. This included original 1910 tiles that were found during the conservation project. They reopened in August 2022. This project included a seismic upgrade, and the restoration was awarded a Heritage Award at the Te Kāhui Whaihanga New Zealand Institute of Architects Auckland Architecture Awards in 2023.

== Description ==
The Public Conveniences and Former Tram Shelter is a single-storey, Edwardian Baroque, masonry building designed by Walter Ernest Bush, the architect of the Grafton Bridge. The main façade facing towards the end of Karangahape Road has a wide central archway with arched windows on either side.
