= Henry Swan =

Henry Swan may refer to:

- Henry Charles Swan (c.1856–1931), English lawyer and New Zealand settler
- Henry Harrison Swan (1840–1916), U.S. federal judge
- Henry Swan (cricketer) (1879–1941), English cricketer and cricket administrator

== See also ==
- Henry Schwann (1868–1931), English first-class cricketer and stockbroker
