= List of category 2 historic places in Auckland =

The List of category 2 historic places in Auckland contains the category 2 heritage sites and buildings from Auckland registered in the New Zealand Heritage List/Rārangi Kōrero (formerly the Register).

This list is maintained and updated by Heritage New Zealand, also known as Heritage New Zealand Pouhere Taonga, initially the National Historic Places Trust and, from 1963 to 2014, the New Zealand Historic Places Trust.

The list also includes known waahi tapu (sacred place), Māori culturally and religiously significant sites and areas. However, they are usually not published. The heritage buildings and areas in Auckland classified as Historic Place Category 1 or Historic Area are listed in the List of category 1 historic places in Auckland.

== List ==
| Name | List Type | Address | Number | Image |
|---|---|---|---|---|
| Holy Trinity Church (Anglican) [Relocated] | Historic Place Category 2 | 22–24 Wainui Road, Silverdale | 491 | |
| Holy Trinity Church (Anglican) | Historic Place Category 2 | 18 Church Street, Devonport | 504 | |
| Shamrock Cottage | Historic Place Category 2 | 73 Selwyn Road, Howick | 506 | |
| Captain MacDonald House (Former) | Historic Place Category 2 | 1 Tanglewood Place, Howick | 507 | |
| Capitol Theatre | Historic Place Category 2 | 610–620 Dominion Road, Mt Eden | 508 | |
| Carey House | Historic Place Category 2 | 2A Coles Ave, Mt Eden | 509 | |
| Champtaloup House | Historic Place Category 2 | 621 Mt Eden Road, Mt Eden | 510 | |
| Church of St Alban the Martyr (Anglican) | Historic Place Category 2 | 443 Dominion Road, Mt Eden | 511 | |
| Crystal Palace Theatre | Historic Place Category 2 | 535–537 Mt Eden Road, Mt Eden | 512 | |
| Greyfriars Church (Presbyterian) | Historic Place Category 2 | 546–552 Mt Eden Road, Mt Eden | 513 | |
| House | Historic Place Category 2 | 42 Marsden Avenue, Mt Eden | 514 | |
| House | Historic Place Category 2 | 358 Mt Eden Road and 2 Batger Road, Mt Eden | 515 | |
| St Barnabas' Church (Anglican) | Historic Place Category 2 | 283 Mt Eden Rd & Bellevue Rd, Mt Eden | 516 | |
| Mt Wellington Stone Cottage | Historic Place Category 2 | King Street And Queen Street, Panmure | 518 | |
| Penrose Farm House | Historic Place Category 2 | 79 Penrose Road | 519 | |
| St Matthias' Church (Anglican) | Historic Place Category 2 | 5 Thompson Road, Panmure | 520 | |
| House | Historic Place Category 2 | 36 Carlton Gore Road, Newmarket | 521 | |
| Masonic Hall | Historic Place Category 2 | 14 Rodney Road, Northcote | 522 | |
| Church of Our Lady of the Assumption (Catholic) | Historic Place Category 2 | 130 Church Street And Galway Street, Onehunga | 523 | |
| Onehunga Woollen Mills (19th Century Portion) | Historic Place Category 2 | 273 Neilson Street, Te Papapa | 524 | |
| Cornwall Park Stone Wall | Historic Place Category 2 | 202–204 Greenlane Rd, One Tree Hill | 526 | |
| Prospect | Historic Place Category 2 | 27 Mt St John Avenue, One Tree Hill | 527 | |
| Charles Thomas Major Statue | Historic Place Category 2 | 41 Golf Avenue; Mangere Road; Hospital Road, King's College, Otahuhu | 528 | |
| King's College Main Block | Historic Place Category 2 | 41 Golf Avenue; Mangere Road; Hospital Road, King's College, Otahuhu | 529 | |
| Mangere East Hall | Historic Place Category 2 | 362 Massey Road, Mangere East | 530 | |
| Nixon Monument | Historic Place Category 2 | 2 Piki Thompson Way And Great South Road, Otahuhu | 531 | |
| Otahuhu College Main Block | Historic Place Category 2 | 74 Mangere Road, Otahuhu | 532 | |
| Otahuhu World War One Memorial | Historic Place Category 2 | Piki Thompson Way And Great South Road, Otahuhu | 533 | |
| Chancery Chambers | Historic Place Category 2 | 2–8 Chancery Street, 16 O'Connell Street and Cruise Lane, | 537 | |
| Albert Park Bandstand | Historic Place Category 2 | Albert Park, 33–43 Princes Street | 538 | |
| Outreach & Auckland City Cultural Centre | Historic Place Category 2 | 1 Ponsonby Rd | 541 | |
| Auckland Gas Company Offices and Workshops (Former) | Historic Place Category 2 | 20 Beaumont Street and Fisher-Point Drive, Freemans Bay | 542 | |
| Auckland Girls' Grammar School Main Block | Historic Place Category 2 | 14–16 Howe St, Herne Bay | 544 | |
| Auckland Hospital Board Building (Y.M.C.A. Building Former) | Historic Place Category 2 | 28 Wellesley Street East | 545 | |
| Parnell Branch Library | Historic Place Category 2 | 390 Parnell Road | 547 | |
| Auckland Technical Institute, Grafton Branch (Trinity Methodist Church Theological College Former) | Historic Place Category 2 | 140 Grafton Road | 548 | |
| Baradene School Mitchelson House | Historic Place Category 2 | 237 Victoria Avenue, Remuera | 551 | |
| Baradene School Original Building | Historic Place Category 2 | 237 Victoria Avenue, Remuera | 552 | |
| Baradene School Stables | Historic Place Category 2 | 237 Victoria Avenue, Remuera | 553 | |
| Berrisville Flats | Historic Place Category 2 | 152 Anzac Avenue and Constitution Hill | 554 | |
| South African War Artillery Memorial | Historic Place Category 2 | Albert Park, 33–43 Princes Street | 556 | |
| Berlei Building | Historic Place Category 2 | 52 Nelson Street and 93 Wellesley Street West | 559 | |
| Coombes' Arcade (Former) | Historic Place Category 2 | 25–27 High Street | 560 | |
| Bus Shelter and Toilets | Historic Place Category 2 | Symonds Street and Grafton Bridge | 561 | |
| Churton Memorial | Historic Place Category 2 | Emily Place and Shortland Street, Emily Place Reserve | 563 | |
| Cintra Flats | Historic Place Category 2 | 9–13 Whittaker Place | 564 | |
| Claybrook | Historic Place Category 2 | 6 Claybrook Road, Parnell | 565 | |
| Bankton | Historic Place Category 2 | 493 Remuera Road, Remuera | 566 | |
| Cricket Ground Pavilion | Historic Place Category 2 | Grandstand Road North, Auckland Domain, Grafton | 569 | |
| Eden Hall | Historic Place Category 2 | 3 Eden Crescent | 570 | |
| Council Chambers and Fire Station (Former) | Historic Place Category 2 | 1 Williamson Avenue, Grey Lynn | 572 | |
| Grand Hotel Facade (Former) | Historic Place Category 2 | 7–9 Princes Street | 576 | |
| Albert Park Lodge | Historic Place Category 2 | 33–43 Princes Street | 577 | |
| George Courts (Apartment Building) | Historic Place Category 2 | 224 Karangahape Road | 580 | |
| Glen Orchard | Historic Place Category 2 | 91 St Heliers Bay Road, St Heliers | 581 | |
| Gloucester Court Flats | Historic Place Category 2 | 1 Franklin Road | 582 | |
| Greys Avenue Flats | Historic Place Category 2 | 95–113 Greys Avenue | 583 | |
| Grey Lynn Public Library | Historic Place Category 2 | 472–474 Great North Rd, Grey Lynn | 584 | |
| Hampton Court | Historic Place Category 2 | 182 Federal Street and 58 Wellesley Street West | 585 | |
| H B Building | Historic Place Category 2 | 246–254 Karangahape Road | 586 | |
| Aickin House | Historic Place Category 2 | 39 Symonds Street and Mount Street | 588 | |
| Houses | Historic Place Category 2 | 350, 356 Richmond Road, Grey Lynn | 592 | |
| House | Historic Place Category 2 | 58 Wallace Street, Herne Bay | 593 | |
| Houses | Historic Place Category 2 | 6, 8, 10, 12, 14, 16 Cracroft Street, Parnell | 594 | |
| Binney House | Historic Place Category 2 | 11 Awatea Road, Parnell | 595 | |
| Burrows House | Historic Place Category 2 | 4 Burrows Avenue, Parnell | 596 | |
| House | Historic Place Category 2 | 15 Bassett Road, Remuera | 597 | |
| Guisnes Court | Historic Place Category 2 | 532 Remuera Road, Remuera | 598 | |
| House | Historic Place Category 2 | 36 Ladies Mile, Remuera | 599 | |
| House | Historic Place Category 2 | 4 Garden Road, Remuera | 601 | |
| Court House (Former) | Historic Place Category 2 | 34 Arney Road, Remuera | 603 | |
| Stansfield House (Former) | Historic Place Category 2 | 30 Arney Road and 3 Arney Crescent, Remuera | 604 | |
| Worley House (Former) | Historic Place Category 2 | 27 Arney Road, Remuera | 605 | |
| Housing Corporation Building | Historic Place Category 2 | 15 Rutland St | 607 | |
| Launch Offices | Historic Place Category 2 | Quay Street | 608 | |
| Freeman's Hotel (Former) | Historic Place Category 2 | 2 Drake Street and Vernon Street, Freemans Bay | 610 | |
| Lewis Eady Building | Historic Place Category 2 | 190–192 Queen St | 611 | |
| Lister House | Historic Place Category 2 | 9–17 Victoria Street East | 614 | |
| Remuera Masonic Hall (Former) | Historic Place Category 2 | 82 Remuera Road and Belmont Terrace, Remuera | 616 | |
| Mayfair Flats | Historic Place Category 2 | 75 Parnell Rd, Parnell | 617 | |
| M.L.C. Building | Historic Place Category 2 | 380 Queen St | 618 | |
| Myers Kindergarten Building | Historic Place Category 2 | 381 Queen Street | 619 | |
| Plummer House (Former) | Historic Place Category 2 | 5 City Road | 621 | |
| Pitt Street Buildings | Historic Place Category 2 | 80 Pitt St | 625 | |
| Pitt Street Church (Methodist) | Historic Place Category 2 | 78 Pitt Street, Newton | 626 | |
| Queens Head Tavern | Historic Place Category 2 | 404 Queen Street | 631 | |
| Queens Wharf Gates | Historic Place Category 2 | Quay Street | 632 | |
| Queen Victoria Statue | Historic Place Category 2 | Albert Park, 33–43 Princes Street | 633 | |
| Rimmers Coffee House | Historic Place Category 2 | 46–48 Parnell Road, Parnell | 635 | |
| Rob Roy Hotel (Former) | Historic Place Category 2 | 133 Franklin Road, Victoria Street West, Union Street and Weld Street, Freemans Bay | 636 | |
| Robert Burns Statue | Historic Place Category 2 | Domain Drive, Auckland Domain | 637 | |
| Roselle-St Kentigern School Administration Building | Historic Place Category 2 | 82–84 Shore Road, Remuera | 638 | |
| St John's Church (Methodist) | Historic Place Category 2 | 229A-231 Ponsonby Road, Ponsonby | 643 | |
| St Jude's Church and Hall | Historic Place Category 2 | 27 St Jude Street, Avondale | 644 | |
| St Kentigern Preparatory School Fernery | Historic Place Category 2 | 82–84 Shore Road, Remuera | 645 | |
| St Kentigern Preparatory School Stables | Historic Place Category 2 | 312 Clifton Road, Whitford, Manukau | 646 | |
| St Luke's Church (Presbyterian) | Historic Place Category 2 | 128–130 Remuera Road, Remuera | 647 | |
| St Mary's College Hall | Historic Place Category 2 | 9–17 New Street, Ponsonby | 648 | |
| St Paul's Church (Methodist) | Historic Place Category 2 | 12–14 St Vincent Ave, Remuera | 651 | |
| St Stephen's Church (Presbyterian) | Historic Place Category 2 | 75 Jervois Road and Shelly Beach Road, Ponsonby | 652 | |
| Shakespeare Hotel | Historic Place Category 2 | 61 Albert Street and Wyndham Street | 654 | |
| Station Hotel (Former) | Historic Place Category 2 | 131 Beach Road, 122 Anzac Avenue and Parliament Street | 657 | |
| Stichbury Terrace | Historic Place Category 2 | 89–95 Jervois Road and Curran Street, St Marys Bay | 658 | |
| T & G Insurance Building | Historic Place Category 2 | 15–31 Wellesley Street West | 659 | |
| Shop (Former) | Historic Place Category 2 | 9 Grafton Road | 667 | |
| Wharf Pavilions (Two Buildings) | Historic Place Category 2 | Quay Street (Near Ferry Building) | 670 | |
| Wright's Buildings | Historic Place Category 2 | 18–20 Fort Street, 13 Commerce Street and 8 Fort Lane | 672 | |
| Church (Methodist) | Historic Place Category 2 | 837 New North Road, Mt Albert | 675 | |
| Ferndale House | Historic Place Category 2 | 830 New North Road And Alexis Avenue, Mt Albert | 676 | |
| Carr House (Former) | Historic Place Category 2 | 10 Woodward Road And Jersey Avenue, Mt Albert | 677 | |
| Post Office (Former) | Historic Place Category 2 | 478 New North Rd, Mt Albert | 678 | |
| Mt Albert Grammar School Building | Historic Place Category 2 | 36 Alberton Ave, Mt Albert | 679 | |
| Oakfield | Historic Place Category 2 | 9 Oakfield Avenue, Mt Albert | 680 | |
| St Luke's Church (Anglican) | Historic Place Category 2 | 704-704B New North Road And Atawhai Lane, Mt Albert | 681 | |
| Church (Presbyterian) | Historic Place Category 2 | 254 Kirkbride Road And Jordan Road, Mangere | 684 | |
| Franklynne | Historic Place Category 2 | 337 Massey Road And 9 Yates Road, Mangere East | 685 | |
| Rennie-Jones Homestead | Historic Place Category 2 | 210 Ihumatao Road, Ihumatao, Mangere | 686 | |
| St David's Church (Anglican) | Historic Place Category 2 | 813 Great South Road; Wallson Crescent, Wiri | 688 | |
| St James' Church (Anglican) | Historic Place Category 2 | 23–31 Church Road And 16–18 Woodward Avenue, Mangere Bridge | 689 | |
| St Paul's Church (Anglican) | Historic Place Category 2 | 141 Chapel Road, Flat Bush | 690 | |
| Selwyn Church (Anglican) | Historic Place Category 2 | 1–5 Hain Avenue And Massey Road, Mangere East | 691 | |
| Selwyn Chapel (Anglican) | Historic Place Category 2 | 103–105 Great South Rd, Papakura | 693 | |
| Pumphouse (Former) | Historic Place Category 2 | Manurere Avenue, Takapuna | 694 | |
| St John's Church (Anglican) | Historic Place Category 2 | 9 Cameron Place and Norrie Road, Drury | 2596 | |
| Waikumete Cemetery Chapel | Historic Place Category 2 | Glenview Rd, Waikumete Cemetery, Glen Eden | 2605 | |
| Coldicutt House | Historic Place Category 2 | 753–755 Mt Eden Road, Mt Eden | 2606 | |
| Dominion Road Methodist Church | Historic Place Category 2 | 426 Dominion Road, Mt Eden | 2607 | |
| House | Historic Place Category 2 | 46 Marsden Avenue, Mt Eden | 2608 | |
| House | Historic Place Category 2 | 60 Marsden Avenue, Mt Eden | 2609 | |
| St Mary's Home Chapel | Historic Place Category 2 | 655–673 Great South Road, Otahuhu | 2610 | |
| Auckland Sunday School Union Building | Historic Place Category 2 | 323–327 Queen Street | 2613 | |
| Seddon Memorial Technical College (Former) | Historic Place Category 2 | 63–67 Wellesley Street East | 2614 | |
| Bandstand | Historic Place Category 2 | Domain Drive, Auckland Domain | 2615 | |
| Brooklyn Flats | Historic Place Category 2 | 66–70 Emily Place | 2617 | |
| John Courts Department Store Building | Historic Place Category 2 | 202 Queen Street | 2619 | |
| Milne and Choyce Department Store (Former) | Historic Place Category 2 | 131 Queen Street | 2620 | |
| Gazebo | Historic Place Category 2 | 44–46 Margot Street, Epsom | 2625 | |
| Elmstone | Historic Place Category 2 | 468 Remuera Road and Orakei Road, Remuera | 2626 | |
| Espano Flats | Historic Place Category 2 | 20 Poynton Terrace | 2627 | |
| House | Historic Place Category 2 | 85 Sarsfield Street, Herne Bay | 2630 | |
| Cox House (Former) | Historic Place Category 2 | 11a Westbourne Road, Remuera | 2632 | |
| Patterson House (Former) | Historic Place Category 2 | 85 Arney Road, Remuera | 2633 | |
| House | Historic Place Category 2 | 1 St Georges Bay Road, Parnell | 2634 | |
| Doctors' Residences (Former) | Historic Place Category 2 | 84–86 Symonds Street | 2635 | |
| Carmichael House | Historic Place Category 2 | 66A St Georges Bay Road and 35 Ruskin Street, Parnell | 2637 | |
| House | Historic Place Category 2 | 4 Takutai Street, Parnell | 2638 | |
| Whitby Lodge | Historic Place Category 2 | 330 Parnell Road, Parnell | 2640 | |
| St Ann's | Historic Place Category 2 | 43 Arney Road, Remuera | 2643 | |
| St Columba Church (Anglican) | Historic Place Category 2 | 100 Surrey Crescent, Grey Lynn | 2644 | |
| St Barnabas' Chapel | Historic Place Category 2 | 44–46 Margot Street, Epsom | 2646 | |
| Tea Kiosk | Historic Place Category 2 | Kiosk Road, Auckland Domain | 2648 | |
| Auckland Harbour Board Workshops (Former) | Historic Place Category 2 | 204 Quay Street, Lower Hobson Street and 85–89 Customs Street West | 2649 | |
| Theosophical Society Hall (HPB Lodge) (Former) | Historic Place Category 2 | 371 Queen Street | 2650 | |
| Wellesley Street Post Office and Telephone Exchange (Former) | Historic Place Category 2 | 18–26 Wellesley Street East and Lorne Street | 2651 | |
| Portland Buildings | Historic Place Category 2 | 463–475 New North Road, Mt Albert | 2653 | |
| Abbeville | Historic Place Category 2 | 25 Nixon Road, Mangere | 2654 | |
| Mangere Schoolhouse (Former) | Historic Place Category 2 | 299 Kirkbride Road, Mangere | 2656 | |
| A.W. Page's Grain Store | Historic Place Category 2 | 468–472 New North Road, Kingsland | 2658 | |
| A.W. Page's Forage Store | Historic Place Category 2 | 468–472 New North Road, Kingsland | 2659 | |
| Epworth Guest House (Methodist) | Historic Place Category 2 | 4 Alexis Avenue, Mt Albert | 2660 | |
| Williamson House | Historic Place Category 2 | 44 Williamson Avenue, Takapuna | 2661 | |
| Royal New Zealand Foundation for the Blind Workshop (Former) | Historic Place Category 2 | 8 George Street and Parnell Road, Parnell | 4353 | |
| Craig's Building | Historic Place Category 2 | 100 Queen Street | 4484 | |
| Cottage | Historic Place Category 2 | 10 Bankside Street | 4486 | |
| Belgrave | Historic Place Category 2 | 12 Symonds Street | 4488 | |
| House (Former) | Historic Place Category 2 | 14 Symonds Street | 4489 | |
| House (Former) | Historic Place Category 2 | 16 Symonds Street | 4490 | |
| Bayreuth | Historic Place Category 2 | 10 Grafton Road | 4491 | |
| New Zealand Wars Memorial | Historic Place Category 2 | Wakefield Street and Symonds Street, Wakefield Street Reserve | 4493 | |
| Lampstands (3) | Historic Place Category 2 | Drake Street and Vernon Street, Freemans Bay | 4495 | |
| Trentham | Historic Place Category 2 | 11 Shelly Beach Road and Cameron Street, St Marys Bay | 4497 | |
| Naval and Family Hotel | Historic Place Category 2 | 243 Karangahape Road and Pitt Street | 4498 | |
| Ngahere | Historic Place Category 2 | 74 Mountain Road and Rockwood Place, Epsom | 4501 | |
| Rockwood | Historic Place Category 2 | 3 Rockwood Place, Epsom | 4502 | |
| Amohia | Historic Place Category 2 | 127 Mountain Road, Epsom | 4505 | |
| Waione | Historic Place Category 2 | 22 Domett Avenue, Epsom | 4506 | |
| Post Office (Former) | Historic Place Category 2 | 311 Manukau Road and Kimberley Road, Epsom | 4507 | |
| Grove House (Former) | Historic Place Category 2 | 22 Merivale Avenue, Epsom | 4508 | |
| Auckland Electric Power Board Substation (Former) | Historic Place Category 2 | 62–66 The Drive, Epsom | 4509 | |
| Post Office (Former) | Historic Place Category 2 | 10 Victoria Road, Devonport | 4510 | |
| Bank of New Zealand (Former) | Historic Place Category 2 | 12–14 Victoria Road, Devonport | 4511 | |
| Alison Clock | Historic Place Category 2 | Marine Square, Devonport | 4513 | |
| House | Historic Place Category 2 | 19 Collingwood Street, Freemans Bay | 4514 | |
| First World War Memorial | Historic Place Category 2 | Victoria Road And King Edward Parade, Devonport | 4515 | |
| Coronation Sea Wall | Historic Place Category 2 | King Edward Parade, Devonport | 4516 | |
| Watson Memorial | Historic Place Category 2 | King Edward Parade, Devonport | 4517 | |
| Devonport Power Station (Former) | Historic Place Category 2 | 47–49 Church Street, Devonport | 4519 | |
| Considine House (Former) | Historic Place Category 2 | 28 Albert Road, Devonport | 4520 | |
| Goldwater House (Former) | Historic Place Category 2 | 26 Cheltenham Road, Devonport | 4521 | |
| House | Historic Place Category 2 | 15 Jubilee Avenue, Devonport | 4522 | |
| House | Historic Place Category 2 | 17 Jubilee Avenue, Devonport | 4523 | |
| House | Historic Place Category 2 | 5 Jubilee Avenue, Devonport | 4524 | |
| Mofflin House (Former) | Historic Place Category 2 | 13 Buchanan Street, Devonport | 4526 | |
| Inglis House (Former) | Historic Place Category 2 | 18–20 Huia Street, Devonport | 4527 | |
| Claremont | Historic Place Category 2 | 14-14A Huia Street, Devonport | 4528 | |
| St Augustine's Church (Anglican) | Historic Place Category 2 | 95 Calliope Road, Devonport | 4529 | |
| Philson House (Former) | Historic Place Category 2 | 41 Stanley Point Road, Devonport | 4530 | |
| House | Historic Place Category 2 | 14 Glen Road, Devonport | 4531 | |
| Auckland Grammar School Janitor's House (Former) | Historic Place Category 2 | 55–85 Mountain Road, Epsom | 4532 | |
| Marire | Historic Place Category 2 | 37 Claude Road, Epsom | 4533 | |
| Ker House (Former) | Historic Place Category 2 | 6 Emerald Street, Epsom | 4534 | |
| Whittome House (Former) | Historic Place Category 2 | 18 Gardner Road And 9A Emerald Street, Epsom | 4535 | |
| Higher Thought Temple | Historic Place Category 2 | 1 Union Street and Warimu Place | 4540 | |
| Fergusson Building | Historic Place Category 2 | 295 Queen St & 1–3 Meyers St | 4573 | |
| P Hayman & Co. Warehouse (Former) | Historic Place Category 2 | 14–18 Customs Street East; Galway Street | 4576 | |
| Smeeton's Buildings (Former) | Historic Place Category 2 | 75 Queen Street; Mills Lane | 4583 | |
| Dingwall Building | Historic Place Category 2 | 87–93 Queen Street; Mills Lane | 4584 | |
| Civic House | Historic Place Category 2 | 287–291 Queen St | 4585 | |
| No Deposit Piano Company Building (Former) | Historic Place Category 2 | 307–319 Queen Street | 4586 | |
| W. A. Thompson and Company Building (Former) | Historic Place Category 2 | 307–319 Queen Street | 4587 | |
| Canterbury Arcade | Historic Place Category 2 | 166–174 Queen St | 4589 | |
| Warwick Building | Historic Place Category 2 | 166 Queen Street | 4590 | |
| Ellison Chambers | Historic Place Category 2 | 138–144 Queen Street | 4591 | |
| Arthur Eady Building (Former) | Historic Place Category 2 | 112–116 Queen Street and 4 Vulcan Lane | 4592 | |
| Imperial Hotel (Former) | Historic Place Category 2 | 66 Queen Street, 4 Fort Street and Fort Lane | 4593 | |
| Windsor House | Historic Place Category 2 | 58–60 Queen Street; Fort Lane | 4594 | |
| Everybody's Building | Historic Place Category 2 | 56 Queen Street; Fort Lane | 4595 | |
| Imperial Buildings | Historic Place Category 2 | 44–48 Queen Street; Fort Lane | 4596 | |
| Endeans Building | Historic Place Category 2 | 2 Queen Street, Quay Street and Tyler Street | 4597 | |
| Shortland Flats | Historic Place Category 2 | 93 Shortland Street and Bankside Street | 4599 | |
| Heard House (Former) | Historic Place Category 2 | 9 Awatea Road, Parnell | 4930 | |
| Braemar | Historic Place Category 2 | 7 Parliament Street | 4932 | |
| McCahon Cottage | Historic Place Category 2 | 67 Otitori Bay Road, French Bay, Titirangi | 5259 | |
| Crawford House | Historic Place Category 2 | 4 Picton Street, Howick | 5260 | |
| Guy's Homestead | Historic Place Category 2 | Guys Road, Pakuranga | 5261 | |
| Fitzpatrick's Cottage | Historic Place Category 2 | in Howick Historical Village (originally at 197 Gills Road, Pakuranga) | 5262 | |
| Brickell Homestead | Historic Place Category 2 | 174 Ridge Road And Vincent Street, Howick | 5263 | |
| Mellons Bay Gun Emplacement | Historic Place Category 2 | 16 Page Point Rd, Howick | 5264 | |
| White Homestead (Relocated) | Historic Place Category 2 | 95 Glenmore Road, Pakuranga | 5265 | |
| Prospect Hill (Former) | Historic Place Category 2 | 40 Ridge Road, Howick | 5267 | |
| Bucklands Cottage | Historic Place Category 2 | 130 Bucklands Beach Road, Howick | 5268 | |
| Mercury Theatre | Historic Place Category 2 | Mercury Lane | 5296 | |
| Bell's Barn | Historic Place Category 2 | Bells Road, Howick Colonial Village, Manukau | 5303 | |
| William Granger's House | Historic Place Category 2 | 12 Trig Road, Whitford | 5304 | |
| Pakuranga Hall | Historic Place Category 2 | 346–348 Pakuranga Road, Pakuranga | 5314 | |
| Kelsey Homestead | Historic Place Category 2 | 1 Howe Street And Ridge Road, Howick | 5320 | |
| Willowbank Cottage | Historic Place Category 2 | 508 East Tamaki Rd, East Tamaki | 5326 | |
| Swan's Arch | Historic Place Category 2 | Central Park Drive, Henderson | 5429 | |
| Star of the Sea Convent Block | Historic Place Category 2 | Granger Road, Howick | 5430 | |
| Auckland Savings Bank (Former) | Historic Place Category 2 | 17 Jervois Road, Ponsonby | 5454 | |
| Vaughan Homestead | Historic Place Category 2 | Long Bay Regional Park, North Shore | 5459 | |
| Onehunga Post Office (Former) | Historic Place Category 2 | 120 Onehunga Mall And Princes Street, Onehunga | 5473 | |
| St Andrew's Church (Presbyterian) | Historic Place Category 2 | 7 Vincent Street And Ridge Road, Howick | 7087 | |
| House | Historic Place Category 2 | 7 Patey St, Remuera | 7105 | |
| Florence Court | Historic Place Category 2 | 6 Omana Ave, Epsom | 7106 | |
| Onehunga Primary School (Former) | Historic Place Category 2 | 83–89 Selwyn Street, Onehunga | 7109 | |
| Hawthorn Dene | Historic Place Category 2 | 280 Botany Rd, Howick | 7173 | |
| Wilson Homestead (Former) | Historic Place Category 2 | 64E Moumoukai Road, Paparimu, Papakura | 7192 | |
| Rannoch | Historic Place Category 2 | 77 Almorah Rd, Epsom | 7198 | |
| Gluepot Tavern | Historic Place Category 2 | 340 Ponsonby Rd, Ponsonby | 7218 | |
| Hotel DeBrett | Historic Place Category 2 | 2–4 High Street, 3A-3B O'Connell Street and 15–19 Shortland Street | 7264 | |
| Former Merchants' House | Historic Place Category 2 | 4 Alfred Street | 7275 | |
| Barrington Building | Historic Place Category 2 | 10 Customs Street East; Galway Street | 7291 | |
| Levy Buildings | Historic Place Category 2 | 20 Customs Street East, Commerce Street and Galway Street | 7292 | |
| Excelsior Building (Former) | Historic Place Category 2 | 22 Customs Street East, Commerce Street and Galway Street | 7293 | |
| Stanbeth House | Historic Place Category 2 | 26–28 Customs Street East; 27 Galway Street | 7294 | |
| Masonic Club / Buckland Building | Historic Place Category 2 | 30–34 Customs Street East, Gore Street and Galway Street | 7295 | |
| A.H. Nathan Warehouse and Condiments Factory | Historic Place Category 2 | 40–46 Customs Street East | 7296 | |
| Sunnydale | Historic Place Category 2 | 108 Parker Road, Oratia | 7350 | |
| Cambria Park Homestead | Historic Place Category 2 | 252 Puhinui Road, Papatoetoe | 7351 | |
| Tepid Baths | Historic Place Category 2 | 86–102 Customs St West | 7377 | |
| House | Historic Place Category 2 | 5 Alten Road | 7398 | |
| Falls Hotel | Historic Place Category 2 | Alderman Drive, Falls Park, Henderson | 7403 | |
| Glen Eden Railway Station | Historic Place Category 2 | Waikumete Rd, Glen Eden | 7435 | |
| Railway Station and Platform (Former) | Historic Place Category 2 | 35 Railside Avenue, Henderson | 7538 | |
| Railway Bridge and Viaduct | Historic Place Category 2 | Parnell Rise, Mechanics Bay | 7585 | |
| Swan Hotel (Former) | Historic Place Category 2 | 31–35 Parnell Rise, Mechanics Bay | 7586 | |
| Wharema | Historic Place Category 2 | 34 Portland Road, Remuera | 7695 | |
| Sonoma | Historic Place Category 2 | 21 Princes Street | 7730 | |
| Ellesmere | Historic Place Category 2 | 23 Princes Street | 7731 | |
| House and Stables (Former) | Historic Place Category 2 | 25–27 Princes Street | 7732 | |
| Pleasant Villa | Historic Place Category 2 | 177 Grey Street, Onehunga | 7754 | |
| Panmure Bridge Swing Span and Abutment | Historic Place Category 2 | 2R Pakuranga Road, Panmure | 9501 | |
| Logan Bank | Historic Place Category 2 | 114 Anzac Avenue and Parliament Street | 9643 | |
| Royal New Zealand Air Force (RNZAF) Institute Building (Former) | Historic Place Category 2 | Hudson Bay Road, Hobsonville Point | 9710 | |
| Royal New Zealand Air Force (RNZAF) Headquarters and Parade Ground (Former) | Historic Place Category 2 | Buckly Avenue and Hobsonville Point Road, Hobsonville Point | 9711 | |
| Butler House (Former) | Historic Place Category 2 | 3 Otahuri Crescent, Greenlane | 9724 | |
| Dilworth School of Agriculture Accommodation House (Former) | Historic Place Category 2 | 53s Otara Road, Otara, Manukau | 9729 | |
| Hobsonville Church | Historic Place Category 2 | 1 Scott Road and Clark Road | 9796 | |
| Ngāti Paoa Urupā | Wahi Tapu | 16 George Bourke Drive, Mount Wellington | 7220 | |
| O Peretu | Wahi Tapu Area | Vauxhall Road, Tamaki Naval Base | 7231 | |
| Te Routu o Ureia | Wahi Tapu | Erin Point, Auckland Harbour Bridge | 7773 | |
| Te Naupata | Wahi Tapu | 20 Musick Point Road; 4 Clovelly Road, Bucklands Beach | 9334 | |

== See also ==
- List of category 1 historic places in Auckland
- Category:Lists of historic places in New Zealand

== Bibliography ==
- New Zealand Heritage List, Heritage New Zealand
