= Imperial Hotel, Auckland =

Hotel building in Auckland, New Zealand

Imperial Hotel (Former)
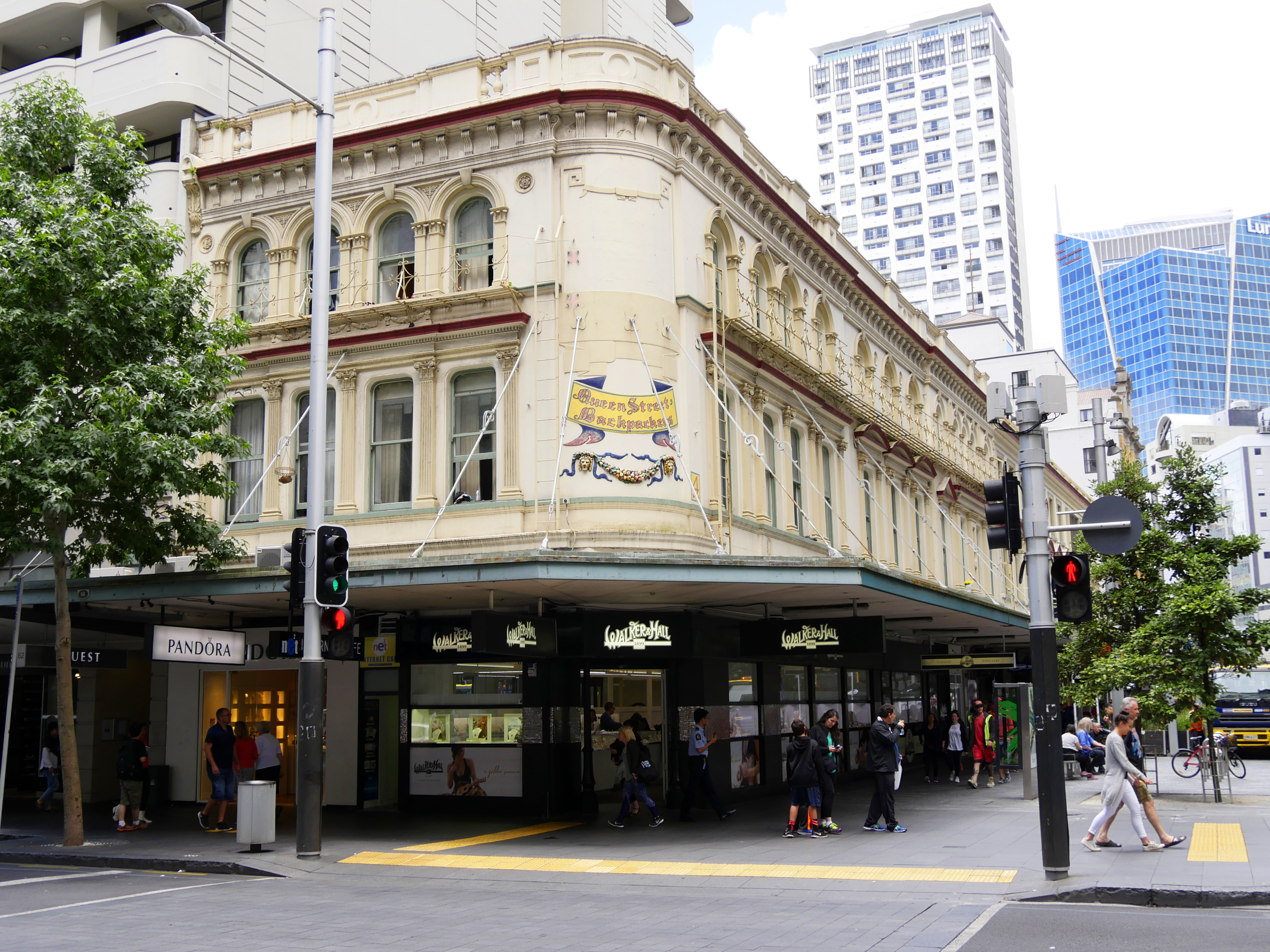
- Former Imperial Hotel, Auckland
- Interactive map of the Imperial Hotel (Former) area

General information
- Location: 66 Queen Street, 4 Fort Street and Fort Lane, Auckland, New Zealand
- Coordinates: 36°50′45″S 174°46′00″E
- Opened: 1883

Height
- Architectural: Victorian architecture Italianate architecture

Design and construction
- Architect: James Wrigley
- Architecture firm: Edward Mahoney and Son
- Main contractor: John Currie

Heritage New Zealand – Category 2
- Designated: 9 September 1987
- Reference no.: 4593

The former Imperial Hotel is located at the corner of Fort and Queen Street in Auckland, New Zealand. It was built in 1883 and is now a notable example of Victorian architecture. The building was registered as a Category 2 heritage building by the New Zealand Historic Places Trust (now Heritage New Zealand) in 1987. The building's current use is as a backpackers hostel, pub, and communal lounge.

== Construction ==
According to the New Zealand Historic Places Trust, construction on the original Imperial Hotel was started and finished in 1883. Auckland architects Edward Mahoney and Son designed the building in a symmetrical pattern. It was constructed by builder John Currie for £4,268 ($6,918), Later, between 1862 and 1873, three additional buildings were added: two other hotel buildings and an outhouse.

== History ==
There was a hotel on the site prior to the construction of the Imperial Hotel, the Metropolitan Hotel, opened in 1858. A fire destroyed much of the original building, which was later demolished. Thomas Anderson, a hotelkeeper, acquired the lease in 1882. He sought to make changes so it could accommodate more people. New liquor legislation, the Liquor Licensing Act 1881, fostered a boom in the hotel industry, as did overall economic growth. As a result, Anderson received a £1000 bond from Hancock Brewers, in exchange for promising to sell their product. This enabled construction of the new hotel building, and the hotel was renamed the Imperial Hotel in 1883. The area had also been used for a set of offices for the Auckland Gas Board and Auckland Harbour Board.

In 1885, the lease changed hands from Anderson to Colonial Mutual, a large Melbourne-based company. They used a portion of the building as their corporate offices, but continued to call the structure the Imperial Hotel. By 1889, the hotel had expanded to incorporate Graham's Buildings from 1862, and was completely accessible from Fort Street.

By the year 1912, the hotel featured a private sitting room, bedrooms, offices, a dining room, and a street level verandah on the first floor, as well as new bedrooms, and a kitchen on the second floor. In 1917, lessee Hancock redesigned the ground floor of the hotel to include a larger public bar, bottle store, and smoke shop.

In 1924, after his company became part of New Zealand Breweries, Hancock decided to purchase the building personally. Five years later, he added a lounge, as well as new toilet facilities, even including a separate facility for women on the first floor. In 1930, the neighbouring Webb's Buildings were purchased and used as hotel space. In 1954, the hotel's bar area was extended into those buildings.

== After the Imperial Hotel ==
The Imperial Hotel ceased operation under that name in 1966, when it became the Lion Tavern, occupying about two-thirds of the ground floor. In 1989, it was renamed Downtown Queen Street Backpackers The first and second floors were remodelled into backpacker accommodation, but the bars on the ground and first floor remained.

The former Imperial Hotel was sold to its current owner, a Chinese consortium, in 2000. Today, what used to be the Imperial Hotel is now Queen Street Backpackers, a hostel for people travelling in and around the area.

== Historic significance ==
The hotel has historic significance; it was developed on a shoreline that was once responsible for bringing goods and other supplies into the area. Since the building housed offices for important organisations including the Harbour Board and the Gas Board, it served as the administrative centre of the city, as well as the social centre. The creation and housing of the Auckland Harbour Board in 1871 played a considerable role in the city's economic development.

The former hotel is also of architectural importance. The Webb Buildings that adjoined the hotel and became part of it in 1954 with the bar expansion show the architecture of James Wrigley. They are one of the only commercial properties Wrigley designed.

The Imperial Hotel was added to the register of the National Historic Places Trust on 10 September 1987.

== Other names ==
The Imperial Hotel building has had the following names, in order from oldest to current:

- Metropolitan Hotel
- Imperial Hotel
- Imperial Tavern
- Lion Tavern
- Graham's Buildings
- Somerset House
- Colonial Mutual Assurance Company Buildings
- Webb's Buildings
- New Zealand Express Company Buildings
- Queen Street Backpackers
