= Crystal Palace, Christchurch =

Demolished cinema in Christchurch, New Zealand

Crystal Palace Theatre
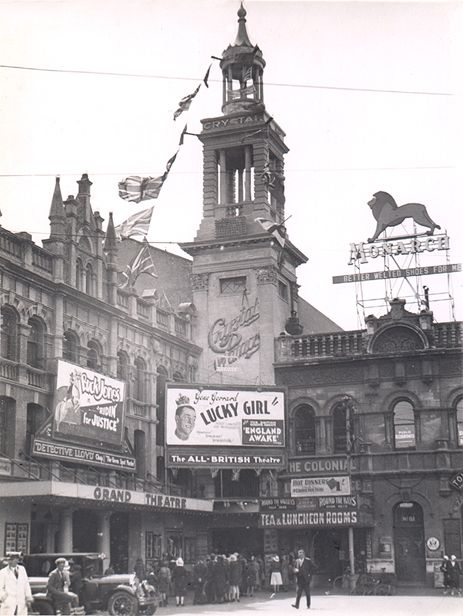
- Crystal Palace Theatre c. 1932, showing Lucky Girl
- Interactive map of Crystal Palace Theatre
- Former names: Carlton Theatre, All-British Theatre
- Location: Christchurch Central City, Christchurch, New Zealand
- Coordinates: 43.53017°S 172.63578°E
- Capacity: 1,088 (opening)

Construction
- Opened: 9 February 1918; 107 years ago
- Demolished: March 1986

The Crystal Palace, later also known as the Greater Crystal Palace, the All-British Theatre, and the Carlton Cinema, was a cinema in central city of Christchurch, New Zealand. The cinema stood in the north-west corner of Cathedral Square from its opening in 1918 to its demolition in March 1986. Te Pae Christchurch Convention Centre now has its southern footprint on this land.

== History ==
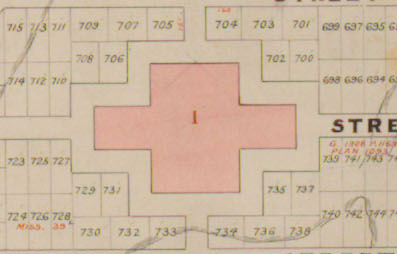
Cathedral Square town sections as per the city's 1850 survey

The land on which the cinema stood, originally the eastern part of Town Section 707, changed hands several times during the early years of Christchurch, between 1851 and 1902. The plot was originally owned by Benjamin Lancaster, who leased it to Isaac Luck. By 1904 the land was owned by William Roper, who in 1917 leased it to William Quill for the purpose of building a theatre. The theatre was opened in February 1918. During construction, a reporter from The Press described the theatre as "beautiful and imposing" with "every consideration given to the most minute details". The building featured a 32 metres (105 ft) tower overlooking the square, lit by seven floodlights modelled on the 1915 Tower of Jewels built for the Panama–Pacific International Exposition. The first film shown was Heart and Soul on 4 April 1918. For the first few years, the theatre only showed movies by Fox Film, before switching to Universal Pictures.

In December 1920 an orchestra pit was added to accompany the silent films that played at the cinema, and this resulted in a name change to Greater Crystal Palace. Just before the end of the decade the theatre was equipped to screen "talkies". In 1932 the cinema became an "All-British Cinema", showing only British films. This was in-line with a policy of the British Empire, and Christchurch was chosen as the first city to host such a theatre in New Zealand, on the basis that it was the "most English" city. The cinema changed hands in 1935.

Beginning in the mid-1940s, the "Chums' Club" started at the nearby Liberty Theatre. This was a special session for school-aged children on Saturday mornings. The theatre would show children's cartoons and movies, and there would be a comic book swap in the foyer. In 1953 the Chums' Club moved to the Crystal Palace theatre, where it remained a fixture of life for local children until the cinema closed for renovations in 1963.

In 1963 the theatre was modified and renamed the Carlton Cinema. The Government Life Insurance Building was built directly next door, and during this period the iconic tower was enclosed in modern metal cladding to match the neighbouring building. The theatre hosted the local film festival for many years.

The building was finally demolished in 1986, with the last film screening on 24 March of that year. The cinema was replaced with a pedestrian shopping mall, named "Crystal Plaza" as a nod to the theatre. The mall was demolished in September 2012 following the 2011 Christchurch earthquakes, and the land became the southern part of the site for Te Pae Christchurch Convention Centre.

== Facility ==
When built, the theatre had capacity for 1,088. The auditorium was five storeys high, with a domed plaster ceiling, a dress circle that seated 400 people, and three private box seats on either side of the screen.

The renovation in the 1960s reduced the capacity to 804, of which 304 seats remained in the dress circle. The entrance was enlarged, and a verandah added to the front of the building. A false roof was installed in the auditorium to improve the acoustics.
