= Falls Hotel =

Hotel in New Zealand

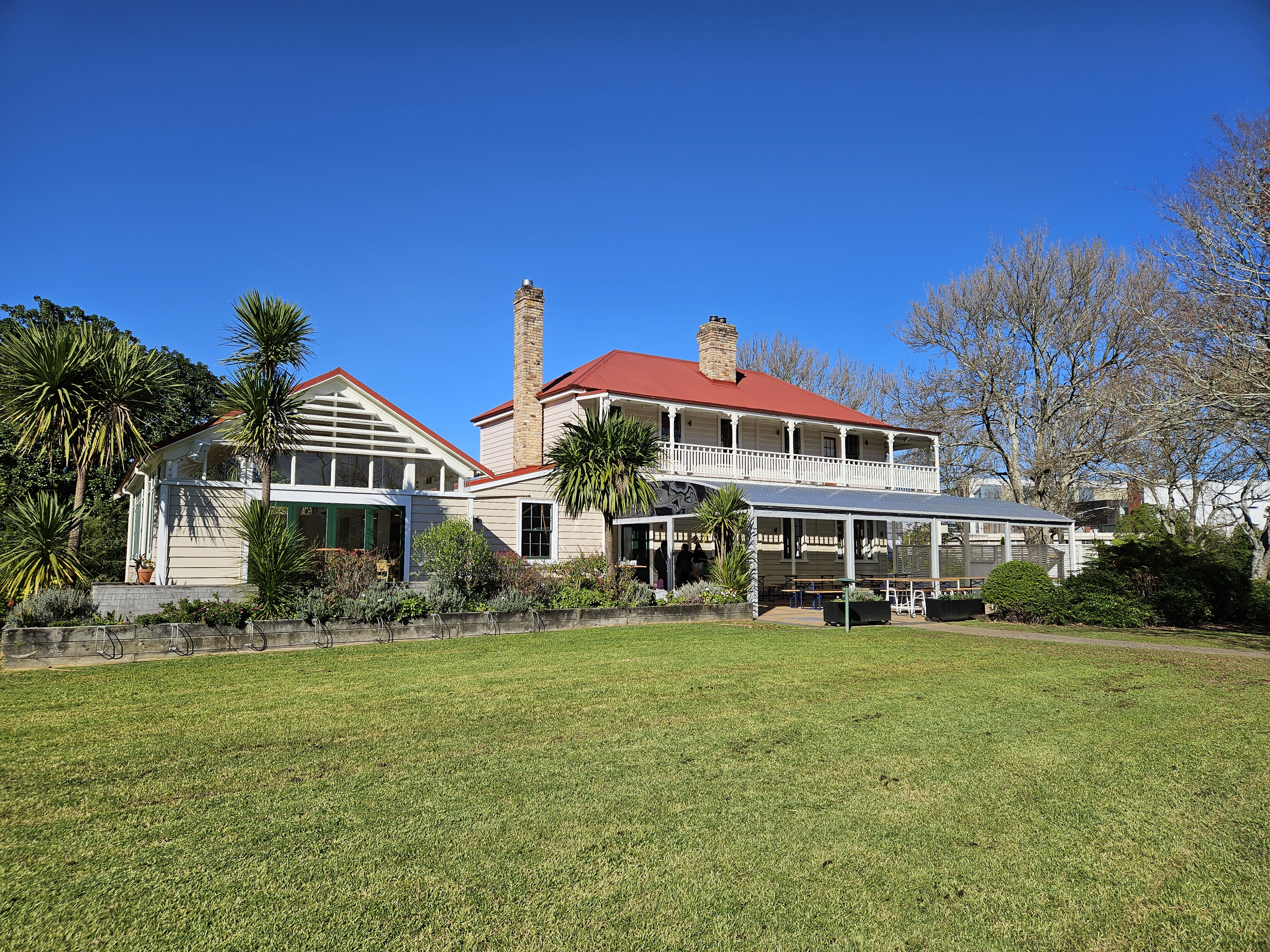
- Falls Hotel
- Interactive map of the Falls Hotel area
- Former names: Oratia Hotel
- Etymology: Oratia Stream, Waitakere Falls

General information
- Architectural style: Georgian
- Location: Alderman Drive, Falls Park, Henderson, Auckland
- Coordinates: 36°52′38″S 174°38′05″E
- Year built: 1873
- Relocated: 1961, 1996
- Renovated: 1996–1998

Heritage New Zealand – Category 2
- Designated: 10 October 1997
- Reference no.: 7403

Falls Hotel, also known as the Oratia Hotel, is a historic Georgian hotel in Henderson, Auckland, New Zealand listed as a Category 2 building by Heritage New Zealand.

Falls Hotel was the first licensed hotel in Henderson and allowed people from Auckland to make — what was at the time — the long trip between the two towns.

== Etymology ==
The name Falls Hotel derives from the Waitakere Falls, as travellers from Auckland would stay in the hotel on their way to the falls. The first recorded name of the hotel was the Aritui Hotel. This name was recorded in both 1874 and 1875. In 1879 the name Oratia Hotel was reported in a news paper. In 1900 the name Henderson Hotel was recorded but this may have been just a descriptive term. In 1925 it was named the Central Hotel and Boarding House. In 1931 it was named as the Central Private Hotel.

== Description ==
The building was originally constructed as a vernacular Georgian recantagle-shaped two-storey timber building. The corner of the building at the intersection of Great North Road and Emma Street (Railside Avenue) was chamfered. A verandah ran around the entirety of the two road facing sides. The building had Georgian sash windows and had timber shingle roofing. The upper storey windows are smaller than the downstairs windows. The interior was very simple as was common for provincial colonial style hotels.

An addition was added in 1907 at the rear. Presumably at a time before 1923 the verandah was raised to cover both floors of the hotel. This redesign has made the building an example of filigree architecture. In the 1930s a single storey lean-to was built up against the rest of the rear.

In 1997 the first floor was enlarged so kitchens could be added. This resulted in the loss of the lean-to structure.

== History ==
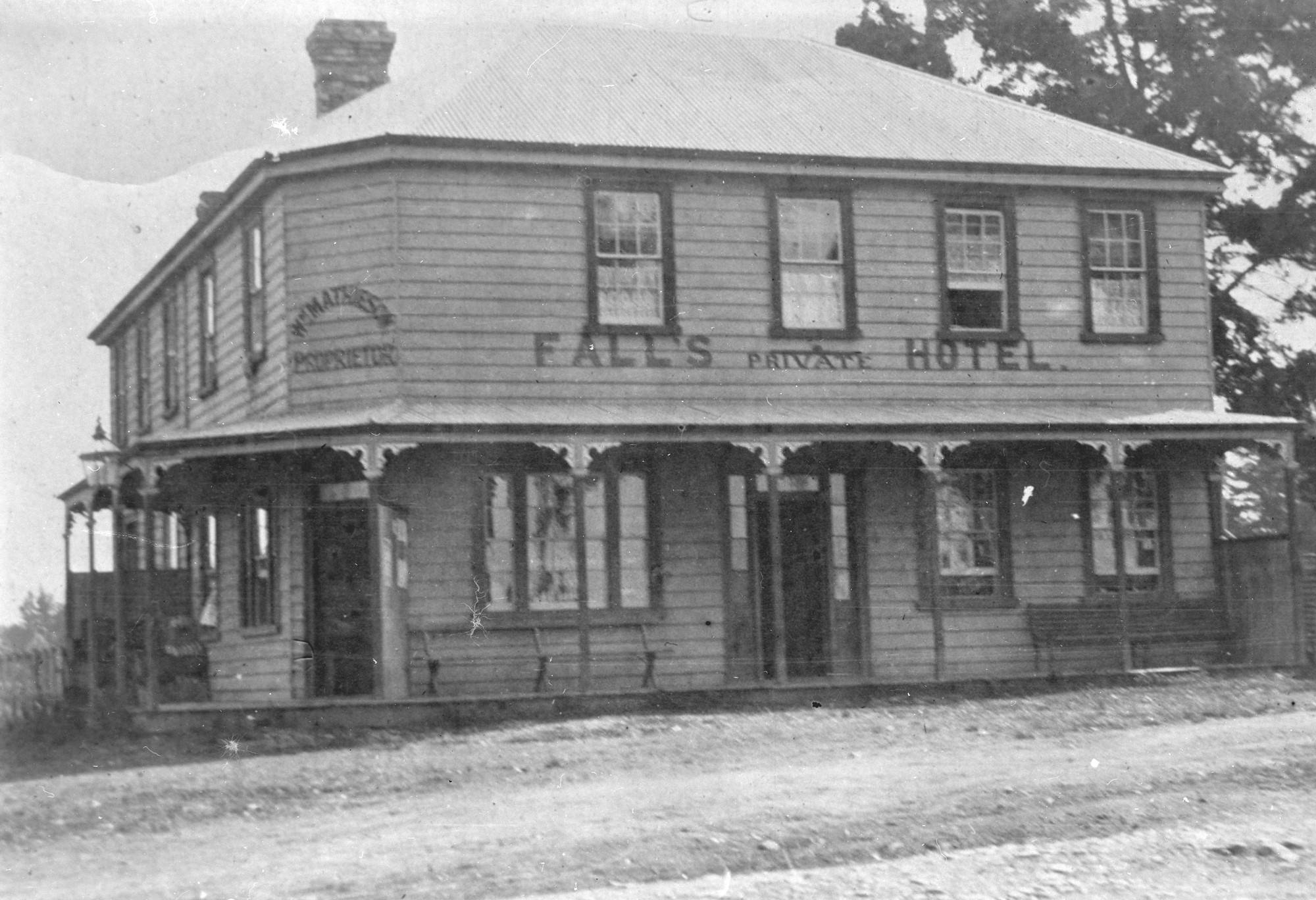
Falls Hotel in the 1910s

John McLeod, nicknamed 'Shepherd', was the manager of Thomas Henderson's farm at his mill since 1858. Henderson owned the land that the hotel was built on. He commented that he initially opposed any idea of opening a hotel when Henderson was still a logging and milling town but later would see the need for one.

Falls Hotel was constructed in 1873 by John McLeod following an extension to Great North Road. It was the first licensed hotel to open in Henderson's Mill. The building featured a shop and butchers, both run by McLeod. McLeod continued to own the hotel until c.1875. Falls Hotel would serve Aucklanders making the trip to Henderson and other areas of West Auckland, which prior to the construction of the railway line would take most of the day. In c.1880 the name of the hotel was changed to Falls Hotel, probably after Waitakere Falls which was a popular tourist destination for Aucklanders. People from Auckland would sail up the Waitemata Harbour to Henderson before heading further out to the Waitakeres.

Other sources give earlier dates of construction. Steve Ozich claims it was built in 1854 or 1855, Anthony Flude states it was built in 1856, and JT Diamond states it was built in 1862.

Falls Hotel served as a social hub for Henderson during this period. The hotel served drinks to people who would arrive after watching horse racing nearby. The St Patrick's day horse races attracted visitors from Auckland. Falls Hotel also housed the local post office (until 1881 when it would move to the Henderson railway station. Cattle sales nearby also drew people to the hotel from as far as Helensville. Prize fights were held outside the hotel and the bantamweight championship was once fought there.

In the early 1900s the hotel had a poor reputation. Following a prohibition on the sale of alcohol in Henderson in 1908 the hotel improved it's reputation. In 1902 the hotel hosted a coroner's court looking into the death of a man following a brawl over a woman.

In 1908 it was purchased by Benjamin Cranwell and William Worrall. They ran it as a board house for a few years before selling it.

Janes Wilkes purchased the hotel in 1912. In 1925 she changed the name to Central Hotel and Boarding House.

In 1931 the hotel was purchased by Steve Ozich. Ozich renamed it to the Central Private Hotel. He ran the hotel for 30 years until 1961 when he relocate it to use the land for retail. The relocation involved the destruction of the two brick chimneys, these were later restored during a restoration project. For more than 30 years the hotel was not run commercially, instead it served as Ozich's residence until 1991, even after he had sold it in 1978. In 1953 a fire broke out in the hotel. Although it was quickly doused the water caused damage to the interior.

In 1996 the owners of the building donated it to the Waitakere City Council. The hotel was later relocated 400 metres to Alderman Drive and undergo restoration headed by the Falls Hotel Preservation Trust. The restoration finished in 1998. Since 2009 the trust has owned the property. Currently Falls Hotel operates with a restaurant and café.

== Legacy ==
Falls Hotel is one of the oldest extant buildings in Henderson and is an example of how provincial hotels were built, in comparison with hotels built in urban areas such as Auckland.

A footbridge near the hotel crossing the Oratia Stream was after McLeod.

Maurice Gee's children's book The Fat Man features a hotel inspired by Falls Hotel.
