= Capitol Theatre (New Zealand) =

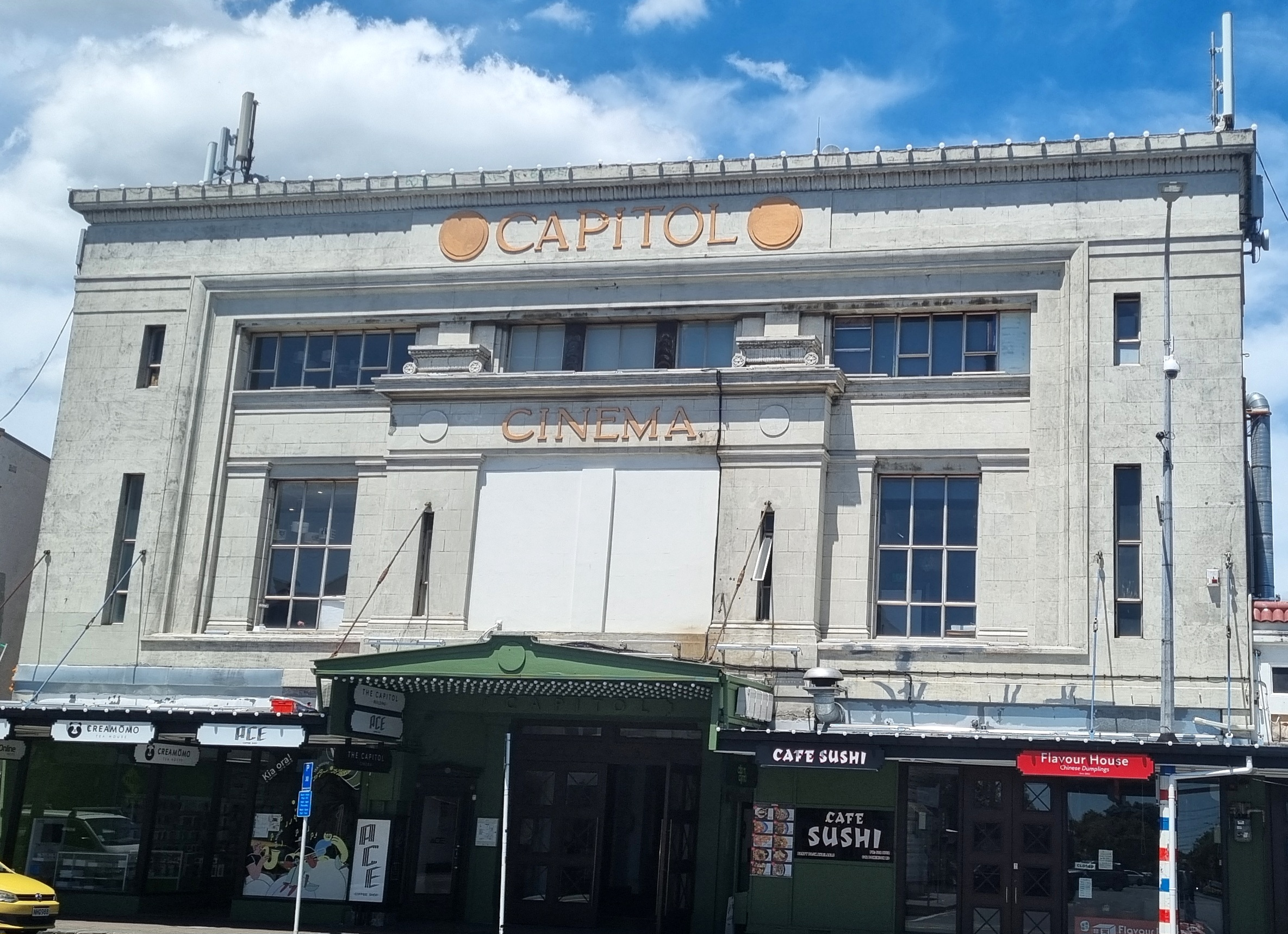
- Capitol Theatre façade
- Interactive map of the Capitol Theatre area

General information
- Type: Theatre
- Architectural style: Neo-Greek
- Location: 610-620 Dominion Road, Mt Eden
- Coordinates: 36°53′16″S 174°44′51″E
- Opened: 18 August 1923

Design and construction
- Architecture firm: Grierson & Aimer
- Main contractor: Noel Cole

Website
- https://www.thecapitol.co.nz/

Heritage New Zealand – Category 2
- Designated: 6 June 1990
- Reference no.: 508

The Capitol Theatre, also known as the Capitol Cinema, is a historic cinema in New Zealand. Situated on Dominion Road in Mount Eden, Auckland, the Capitol Theatre is registered as a category 2 building with Heritage New Zealand.

== Description ==
The Capitol Theatre is a four-storey neo-Greek building with the bottom floor being for retail shops.

The Capitol Theatre's interior is decorated in an art deco style with a purple and gold pallet.

== History ==
The Capitol Theatre was designed by Hugh Grierson and Kenneth Aimer and built by Noel Cole for Messrs Hardley and de Luen. It opened on 18 August 1923 with capacity for 900 patrons. It was named after the Temple of Jupiter Capitolinus. Hardley and de Luen were property developers and leased the theatre to be run by others with John Quinn being the first.

In May 1934 the building was renovated under the new manager Edward Greenfield. Greenfield managed the theatre until his death in 1963. In 1978 the building's interior was severely damaged by a fire. In 1986 it reopened as Charley Gray's and was in use as an art house cinema from 1992. In 1998 it became the Capitol Theatre although half the building had been converted into an indoor rock-climbing facility. The theatre screened Bollywood films until it closed in 2008. In 2009 it was re-opened under a new owner. It closed in 2019, before shortly reopening under new management.

== Legacy ==
The Capitol Theatre was one of the most popular suburban theatres in Auckland. The Auckland Film Society's chairman said the theatre:

created an atmosphere of real enthusiasm for film culture in which the society felt right at home. You’d climb the steps to the theatre and enter a shabby, slightly eccentric environment where real film lovers could tell at once they were understood and appreciated.

The building has a category A registration with Auckland Council.
