= Crystal Castles (disambiguation) =

Crystal Castles was a Canadian electronic music group.

Crystal Castles may also refer to:

- Crystal Castles (2008 album)
- Crystal Castles (2010 album)
- Crystal Castles (video game), a 1983 arcade game
- Crystal Castle, a fictional castle in She-Ra: Princess of Power

== See also ==
- Crystal Palace (disambiguation)
