= Glass Palace =

Glass Palace may refer to:

== Buildings ==
- Glaspaleis, a former fashion house and department store in Heerlen, Netherlands; now a cultural center
- Glaspalast (Munich), a former exhibition hall in Munich, Germany
- Glaspalast (Sindelfingen), an indoor sporting arena in Sindelfingen, Germany

== Other uses ==
- The Glass Palace, a novel by Amitav Ghosh

== See also ==
- Crystal Palace (disambiguation)
