= Dominion Road Methodist Church =

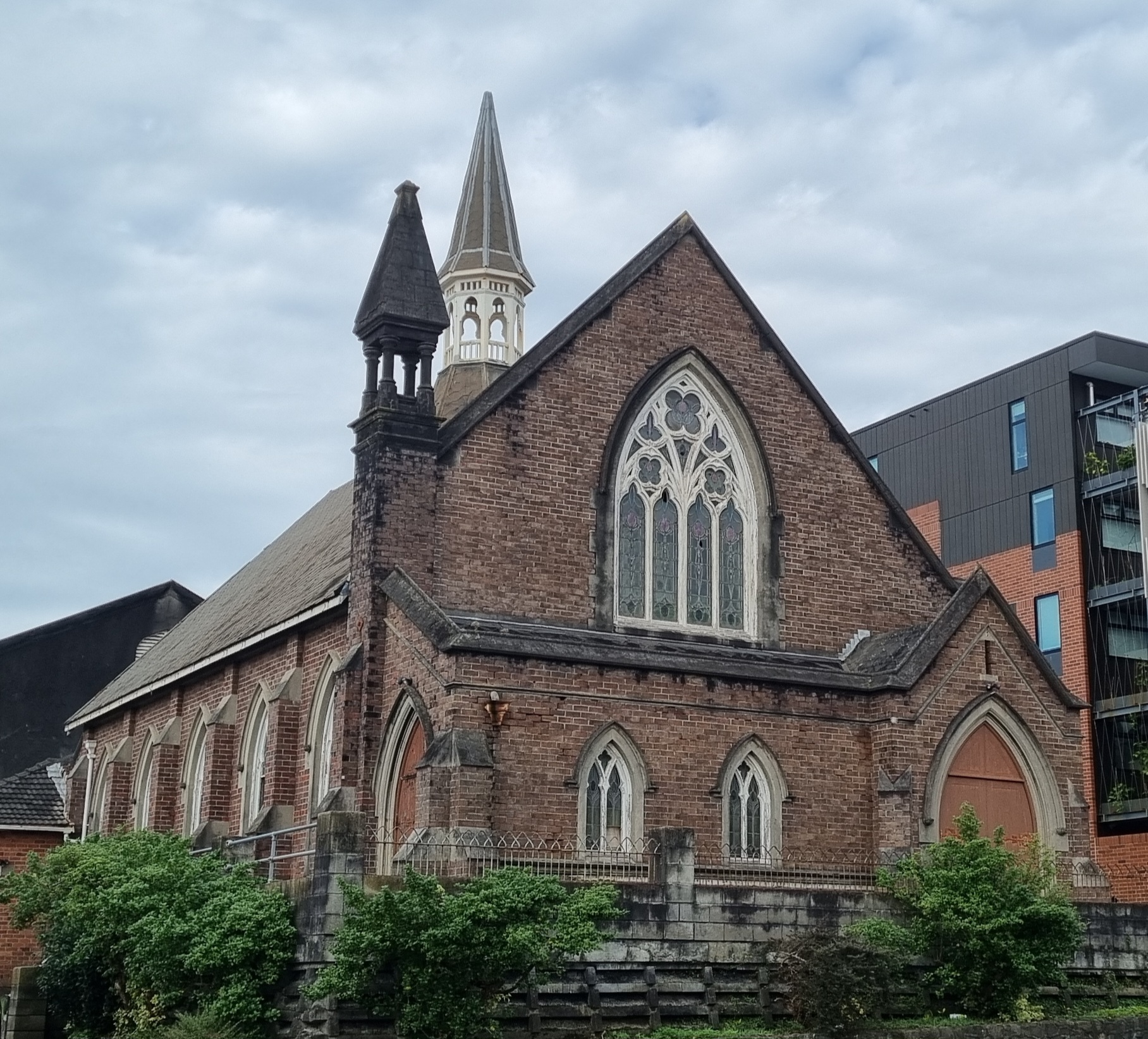
- Dominion Road Methodist Church
- Dominion Road Methodist Church
- 36°52′55″S 174°44′58″E
- Location: Dominion Road, Mount Eden, Auckland
- Address: 426 Dominion Road, Mt Eden
- Country: New Zealand
- Denomination: Methodist
- Website: https://www.methodist.org.nz/

History
- Former name: Mt Roskill Primitive Methodist Church
- Founded: 1897

Architecture
- Architect: Arthur White
- Years built: 1914–c.1916

Heritage New Zealand – Category 2
- Designated: 11 November 1981
- Reference no.: 2607

Dominion Road Methodist Church is an early 20th century Methodist church located in Mount Eden, Auckland, New Zealand. It is listed as a Category 2 building by Heritage New Zealand.

== Description ==
The church is designed in a Gothic Revival style with floral leadlight windows, a small spire, and an asymmetrical bell turret.

== History ==
Originally, the Primitive Methodists used a cottage, which was also run as a Sunday school, for church services. On the 2nd of December, 1896, the local Primitive Methodist committee decided to erect a church in the County of Eden area. After climbing Mount Eden on the 6th of December, they found a suitable spot and decided that it would become the location of their new church. The land for the church was donated by Thomas Hanson, a settler from Sunderland who subdivided land and sold housing in Mount Eden. It was decided that a church 35 ft (11 m) long and 22 ft (6.7 m) wide, with a 14 ft (4.3 m) high stud, would be constructed. Messrs Sayer and Cook were paid £157 to build it. The price was on par with a typical house of the time. This church was opened on the 16th of May, 1897.

The Primitive Methodists later united with the Methodist Church in the Methodist Union of 1913, which was followed by the Methodist Union Act 1913. Due to the popularity of the church, as well as of the nearby Wesleyan church (which was located on Mount Eden Road), they both remained separate; however, due to the renaming of Mount Roskill Road to Dominion Road in 1907, it was decided that the church would be renamed to Dominion Road Church. Following the union, it was proposed to build a brick church for the congregation: all the Primitive churches had been made of wood, whilst the main Methodist church in Auckland, which was called Pitt Street Church, was made of brick. In 1914, the old wooden church was moved to make way for the new brick church. Construction of this new church began in 1915, under a design from White and Wiseman. Originally, it was planned that the church would have chairs, but this was changed to pews as the First World War caused the price of chairs to go up. Originally planned to have seating for 350 worshipers, the plan ended up only supporting 299. Completion was either 1915 or 1916. There were plans for enlargement but these were never carried out. The church was designed by Herbert White. The first service was held on 24 March, 1916.

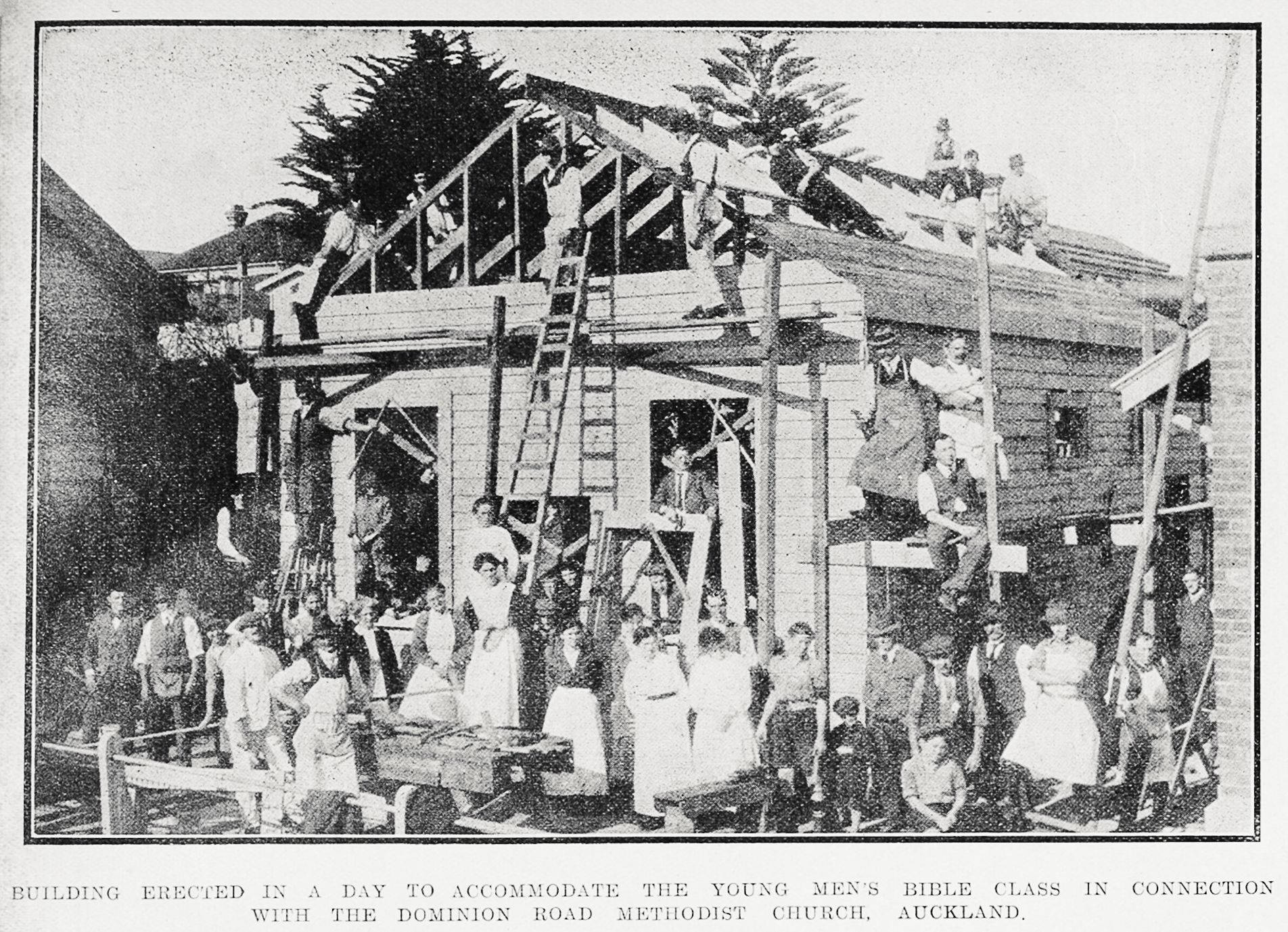
Construction of the Dominion Road Young Men's Institute

During the war, many young men were conscripted and died overseas. Lance Corporal Percy Watkinson of the 2nd Battalion, Cantbeury Regiment, was the son of two congregation members who died during the war, at Passchendaele. His will stipulated that £200 of his insurance money be donated to the church to help fund the building of a school hall for boys and young men. Following further funding, the church constructed another hall for a young men's Bible class, which was named the Dominion Road Young Men's Institute. After 1947, this building became the church parlour.

In 1922, to celebrate both the centenary of Methodism in New Zealand, and to accommodate for increased demand for the Sunday school, it was decided that a new hall was to be constructed. The hall had a roll for 400 students and was split between girls and boys, with separate entrances for each gender. The old building was taken to Waterview and, as of 1997, was still in use. On the 12th of December 1925, the Methodist Centenary Hall was opened. This inauguration was attended not only by senior Auckland Methodist ministers, but also by members of the Presbyterian, Baptist, Anglican, and Congregational churches. One reverend travelled from Hastings to attend. The building was designed in a Gothic style by S.E. Chappell and cost an estimated £4,950 to build.

Following the Second World War, austerity had hit and people were parsimonious; despite this, the church purchased and renovated a villa at 5 Paice Avenue for £1,225. This was to serve as a parsonage. Due to the austerity measures of the New Zealand Government, combined with the parlour burning down on the 21st of February, 1950 saw financial difficulties for the church. In 1951, the church split from the Pitt Street Church.

In October of 1976, the church allowed the Tongan Fellowship to use the building for services. During the 1981 Springbok Tour, the church took a view opposite to that of the Methodist Church and opposed the protests, although opinions in the church were divided. In 1988, the Auckland Fellowship, a Fijian-Indian fellowship, would start holding services.

The traditional congregation had declined over the years and by the time of the centenary. The Tongan congregation had grown quite large and was the largest congregation using the church. Later on the English and Fijian-Indian congregations moved to the Mt Eden Methodist Church. The Tongan congregation still use the church but the building requires seismic strengthening.
