= Baradene College of the Sacred Heart =

State-integrated school in New Zealand

Location
- 237 Victoria Avenue, Remuera, Auckland, New Zealand; 36.8653°S 174.8016°E

Information
- Type: State-integrated
- Motto: Cor unum et anima una in Corde Jesu ("One Heart and One Mind in the Heart of Jesus")
- Religious affiliation: Roman Catholic
- Established: 1909; 117 years ago
- Ministry of Education Institution no.: 61
- Principal: Alexandra Russell (since 2025)
- Years: 7–13
- Gender: Girls
- Enrolment: 1,531 (July 2026)
- Socio-economic decile: 9Q
- Website: www.baradene.school.nz

Baradene College of the Sacred Heart is a Catholic high school for girls aged from 11 to 18 (Year 7–13) located in Remuera, Auckland, New Zealand. It is based on the philosophy of Madeleine Sophie Barat, who founded the Society of the Sacred Heart.

Established in 1909, Baradene celebrated its 100th year in 2009.

The students participate in school events such as House Parades, swimming sports, athletics day and house singing, gaining points for their houses.

They also have, at the end of each year, a school mass farewelling the seniors of the school, opening mass (celebrating the new school year) and individual year level liturgies.

Every year a different school goal is chosen as the focus of the year from the list of 5:

- Social awareness which impels to action
- Faith which is relevant in today's world
- A deep respect for intellectual values
- The building of community as a Christian value
- Personal growth in an atmosphere of wise freedom

Three school buildings, Mitchelson House, the original building, and the former stables, are listed as Category 2 Historic Places by Heritage New Zealand.

== Admissions and enrolment ==
As a state-integrated school, Baradene College charges New Zealand-resident students compulsory attendance dues plus requests voluntary donations. For the 2025 school year, the attendance dues payable is $532 per year for students in Year 7 and 8, and $1,080 per year for students in Year 9 and above. The requested donation is $4,940 per year for students in Year 7 and 8, and $5,001 per year for students in year 9 and above.

As of July 2026, Baradene College has roll of 1,531 students, of which 142 (9.3%) identify as Māori.

As of 2026, Baradene College has an Equity Index of 370, placing it amongst schools whose students have the fewest socioeconomic barriers to achievement (roughly equivalent to deciles 9 and 10 under the former socio-economic decile system).

== Houses ==
Baradene College has six houses:

- Amiens (Red)
- Barat (White)
- Erskine (Yellow)
- Loreto (Green)
- Philippine (Purple)
- Stuart (Blue)

Students attend a House Mass in the school chapel once a year. The houses also compete to gain points in events such as House Parades, sports events and House Singing. Academic awards also reward points. At the end of the school year the house with the most points will be rewarded with the House Cup.

== Gallery ==
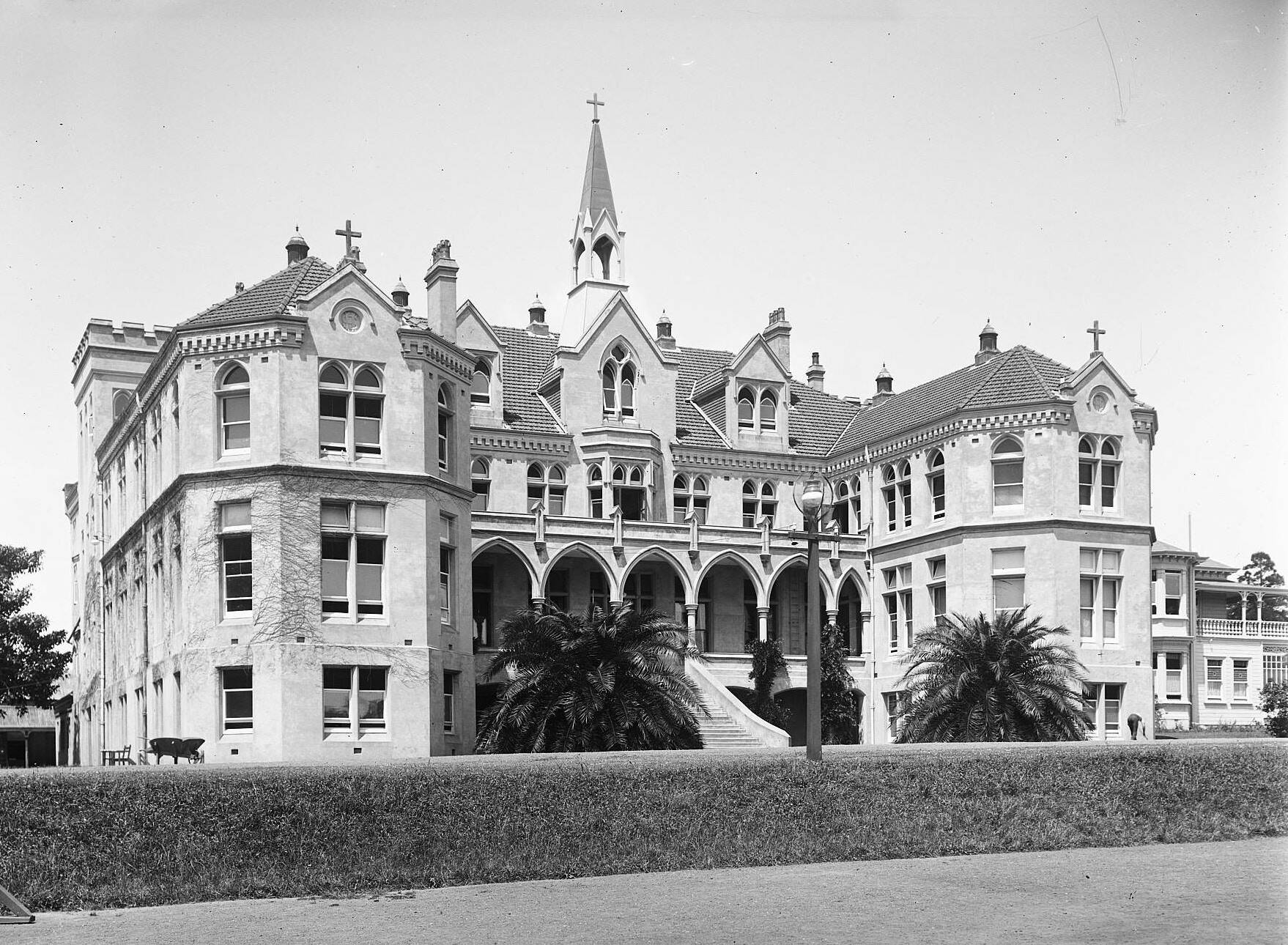
Baradene College in 1923

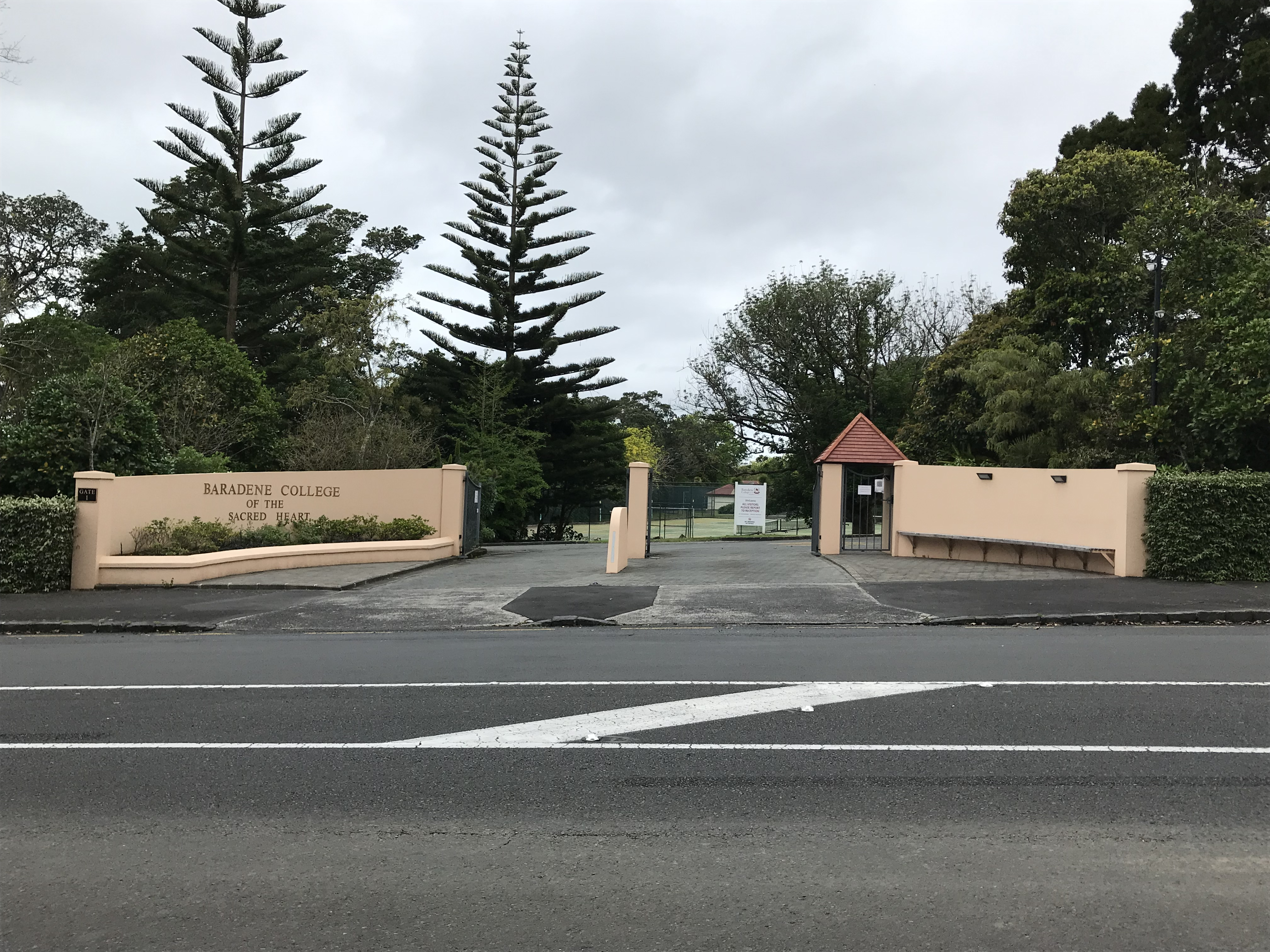
Gates of Baradene College

== See also ==
- List of schools in New Zealand
- Network of Sacred Heart Schools
