= Walter Bush (civil engineer) =

New Zealand civil engineer

Walter Ernest Bush (8 September 1875 – 29 January 1950) was a New Zealand civil engineer. He was born in Kingston upon Thames, Surrey, England on 8 September 1875. As Auckland's city engineer, he was on the competition panel for the Auckland Civic Centre.
