= Henry Charles Swan =

English recluse (c. 1856 – 1931)

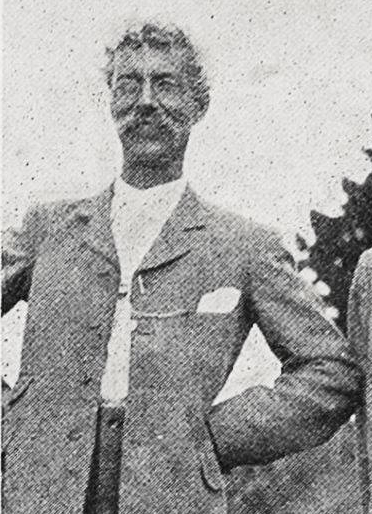
- Born: Henry Charles Swan c. 1856; Gateshead, England
- Died: 7 November 1931 (aged 74–75); Henderson, Waitemata County, New Zealand
- Occupations: lawyer, early settler of New Zealand

Henry Charles Swan (c. 1856 – 1931) was an English lawyer and New Zealand settler. In 1901 or 1902, he left for a supposed solo yacht trip around the world but instead ended up sailing up a tidal tributary of Te Wai-o-Pareira / Henderson Creek, on New Zealand's North Island, where he lived inside his yacht for at least 25 years until his death.

He built Swan's Arch, which became a Category 2 listed structure.

== Early life ==
Swan was born c. 1856 in Gateshead, England, to Joseph and Ann Swan (née Robson). Swan's father's profession is not recorded but it is believed he was a wealthy individual, possibly a large shareholder in the "London and Great Eastern Railway Company" (presumably the Great Eastern Railway). He graduated in law from Oxford University and was admitted to the Inner Temple. Swan worked at one of the oldest legal firms in Newcastle upon Tyne, known as Arnott, Swan, and Walker, which had been founded by his uncle, from 1880 until at least 1891. Swan married his wife, Edith Mary Widdrington, in Ontario, Canada, at age 25. Before leaving for New Zealand, Swan had established an orchard in Northumberland following an interest in botany. Swan arrived in New Zealand with his wife sometime after leaving his job. (Note: Swan left for New Zealand between 1891 and 1895. Spencer Lumsden Arnott who joined the firm in 1892 claims to have remembered Swan, which suggests Swan did not leave before that time.) Swan purchased a 28-hectare (69-acre) section in Henderson alongside Henderson Creek in November 1898 for 220 pounds. This section was subdivided in 1915 with Swan retaining 5.3 hectares (13 acres).

Swan and his wife lived in Devonport, and in either 1901 or 1902 he sailed out onto the harbour aboard the Awatea, the yacht he had purchased in 1900. Most reports state Swan had told people he was going to sail around the world.

== Life as a recluse ==
During his time as a recluse Swan had become involved in botany again. Swan was propagating for the purpose of dealing with orchard pests.

One story about Swan states that no one had heard of Swan since his supposed voyage until 1910, when two boys exploring the Waitemata Harbour managed to head up the stream in their boat. They came across a yacht, and orchard crops, alongside Swan himself. Despite reports of Swan being a complete recluse and being 'discovered' in 1910 after years of isolation there is evidence this is either untrue or a heavily distorted story. Swan was a member of the Plumer Domain Board from 1907 to 1923 and helped create the domain. Swan's wife was known to meet him every Friday at the Henderson railway station. Swan also had his place of residence listed as Henderson on the electoral roll of 1905.

Swan was known to some locals as the 'Henderson hermit'.

Swan studied theology and astronomy during his years on the boat. Local children would come visit him and he taught them about heaven and how to swim.

Swan's death was announced via telegram on 12 November 1931. He died on 7 November at an Edmonton Road property, being cared for by neighbours. He was cremated at Waikumete Cemetery.

Upon his death his £35,000 estate was bequeathed to his wife who still lived in Devonport. His wife remained in Devonport until her death. Swan and his wife had no children.

== Legacy ==
Swan's death was reported all over the country as well as back in Tyneside, England. He was described as a "brilliant barrister" and as an "eccentric Englishman". Rumours spread that his estate was worth £250,000. In actuality his estate was worth less than £35,000.

One person who had met Swan recalled that Swan had dug up an apple and offered it to him. Swan claimed the apple was 25 years old and he had used a scientific method of preserving it. An apple Swan propagated known as the Golden Swan was well known in West Auckland.

Swan has been remembered as a kind and charitable man who would give his money to those in need. His obituary described him as a philanthropist who "liberally" gave to charity and the poor.

Lucy Cranwell-Smith, a highly regarded botanist, credits Swan with helping foster her interest and learning about botany.

Maurice Shadbolt's novella, Dove on the Waters, is inspired by Swan's life.

=== Swan's Arch ===
Swan's Arch
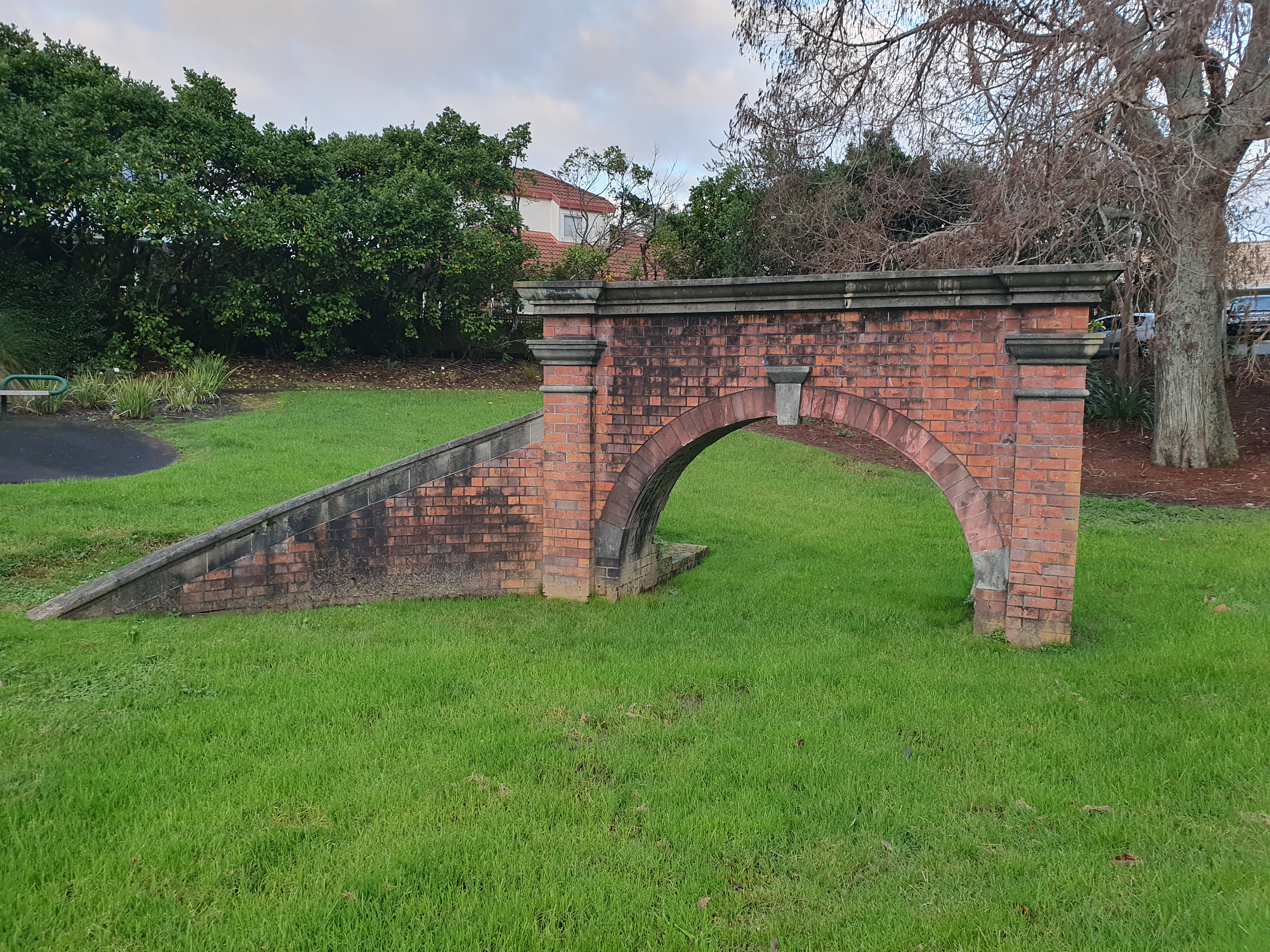
- Swan's Arch

General information
- Architectural style: Victorian
- Location: Central Park Drive, Henderson
- Construction started: Likely before 1923
- Completed: Likely between 1921 and 1927

Technical details
- Material: Brick and mortar, concrete

Design and construction
- Architect: Henry Charles Swan

Heritage New Zealand – Category 2
- Designated: 12 December 1991
- Reference no.: 5429

Swan built tunnels to store his crops and books using bricks that had fallen off the pottery ships in the side of the creek. He also built an arch. The tunnels were destroyed by flooding in 1929, but the arch survived. It is near Central Park Drive, in Swan Arch Reserve.

The purpose of the arch is not known, but a neighbour's son said it was supposed to be part of a swimming pool and fountain, possibly for the purpose of teaching children how to swim. Other theories include it being intended to house his yacht (unlikely due to the size of the yacht compared to the arch), a bridge for crossing the stream, or a type of folly, which were popular in England when Swan was living there.

Swan likely constructed the arch before 1923 but the construction date is unknown.

An obituary for Swan described the arch as 'a remarkable arch of masonry'. An Auckland Council heritage assessment report described it as a 'gateway to nowhere' and assigned it a category B heritage rating.

Alongside the arch Swan built a cellar vault that is still extant. The cellar vault was likely constructed between 1921 and 1927. (Note: Government records mention that in 1921 there was a hut but make no mention of anything else. In 1927, the records only mention a vault.)

The arch remained quite secluded so was undisturbed despite the development of Henderson. After the construction of Central Park Drive in the 1980s the arch and creek was discovered after being largely forgotten. The stream had filled in, but the effort of locals to preserve the arch, including obtaining a Historic Places Trust listing, led to the arch being protected with a reserve created around it. Roughly 1 metre (3 ft 3 in) of the arch is now no longer visible because of a build up of dirt.

The arch itself is an open barrel vault with the northern side decorated. Most of the southern end of the vault is missing. The entrance to the vault boasts two Tuscan pilasters that have a parapet with capitals slightly above. A keystone is featured on the northern side. The arch and wall's bricks are laid in Flemish bond with the soffit being laid in header bond.

The cellar vault, likely built as a library, has decayed and partially collapsed over the years. It is nearly 2 metres (6 ft 7 in) high and more than 7 metres (23 ft) in length.

=== Awatea ===
Swan's yacht was taken from the creek several years after his death and was later restored. In the 1990s, it was still being sailed.

== Gallery ==
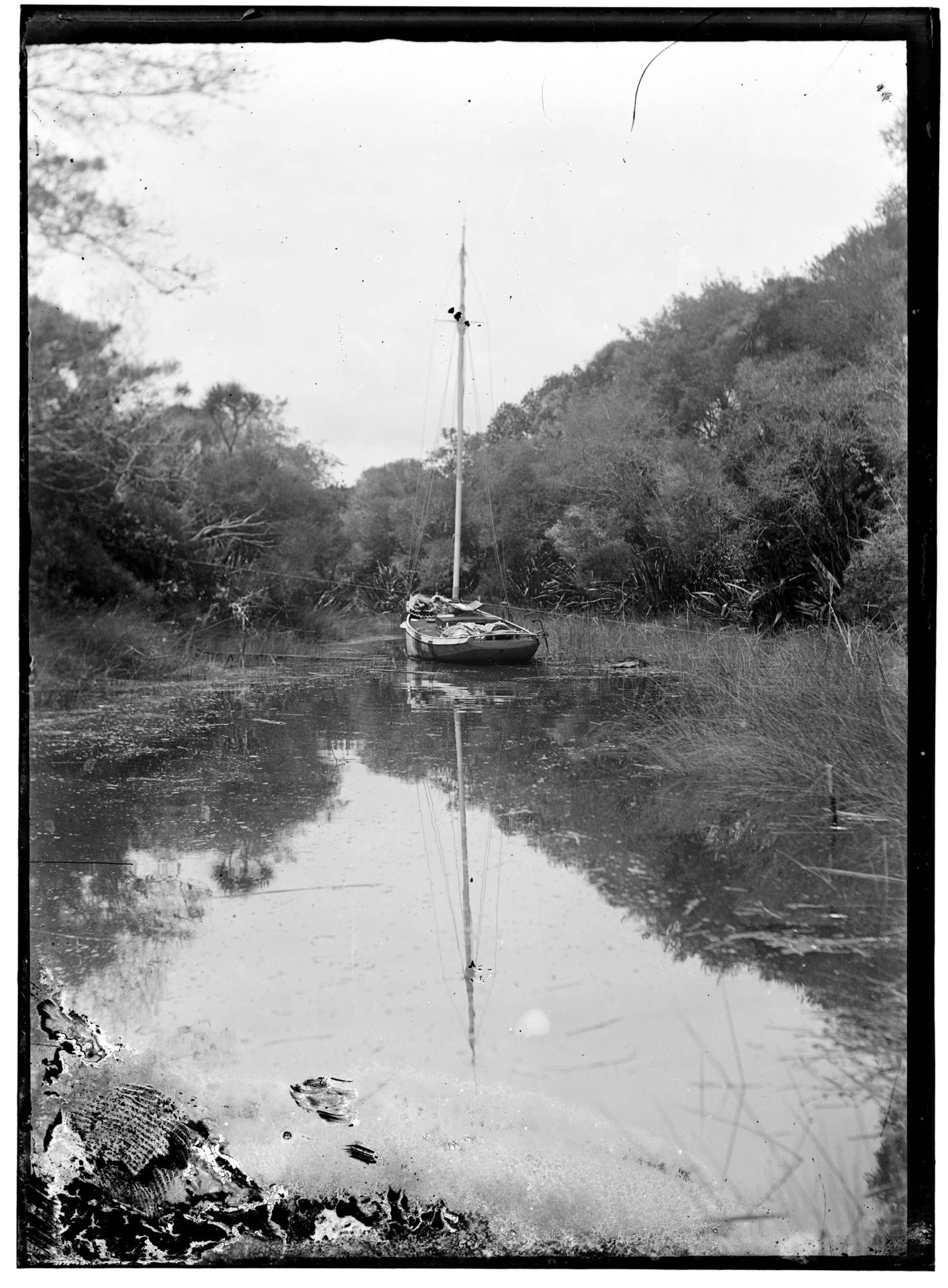
The Awatea moored in Henderson Creek, shortly after Henry Charles Swan's death.

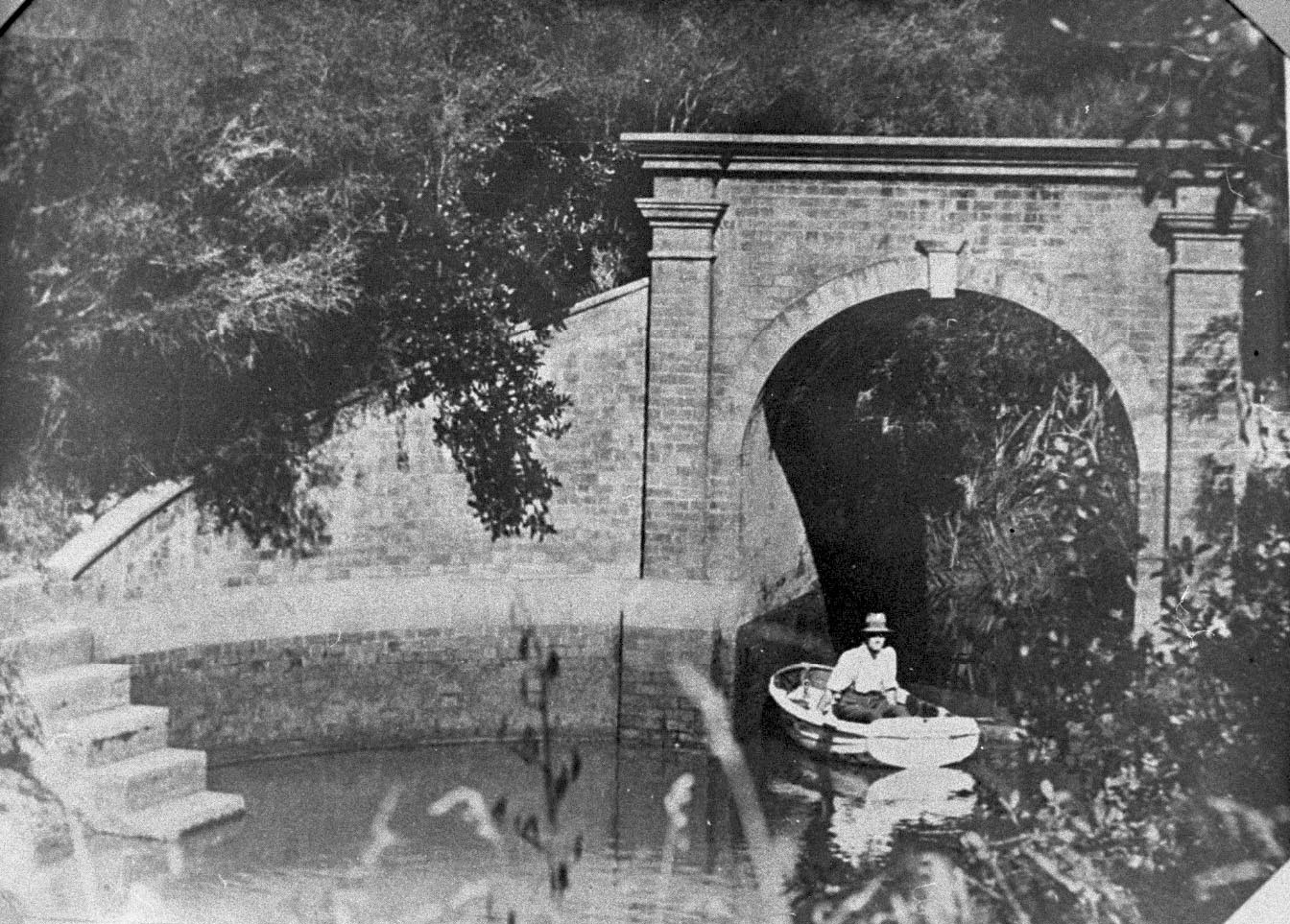
A man in a boat by Swan's Arch circa 1920. The tributary stream pictured here was redirected to flow through a pipe.

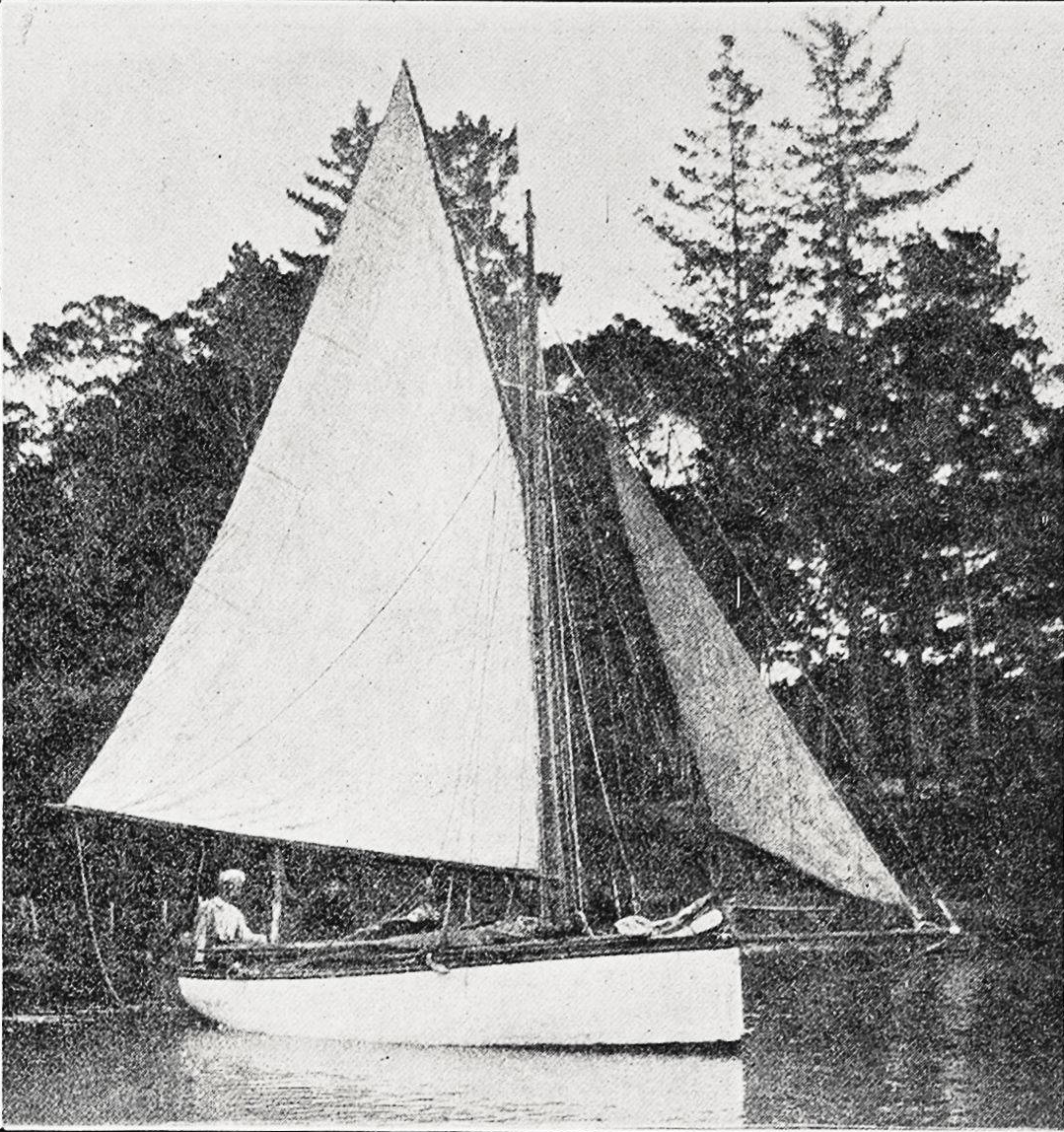
The Awatea
