= Crystal Palace Theatre =

Heritage theatre building in Auckland, New Zealand

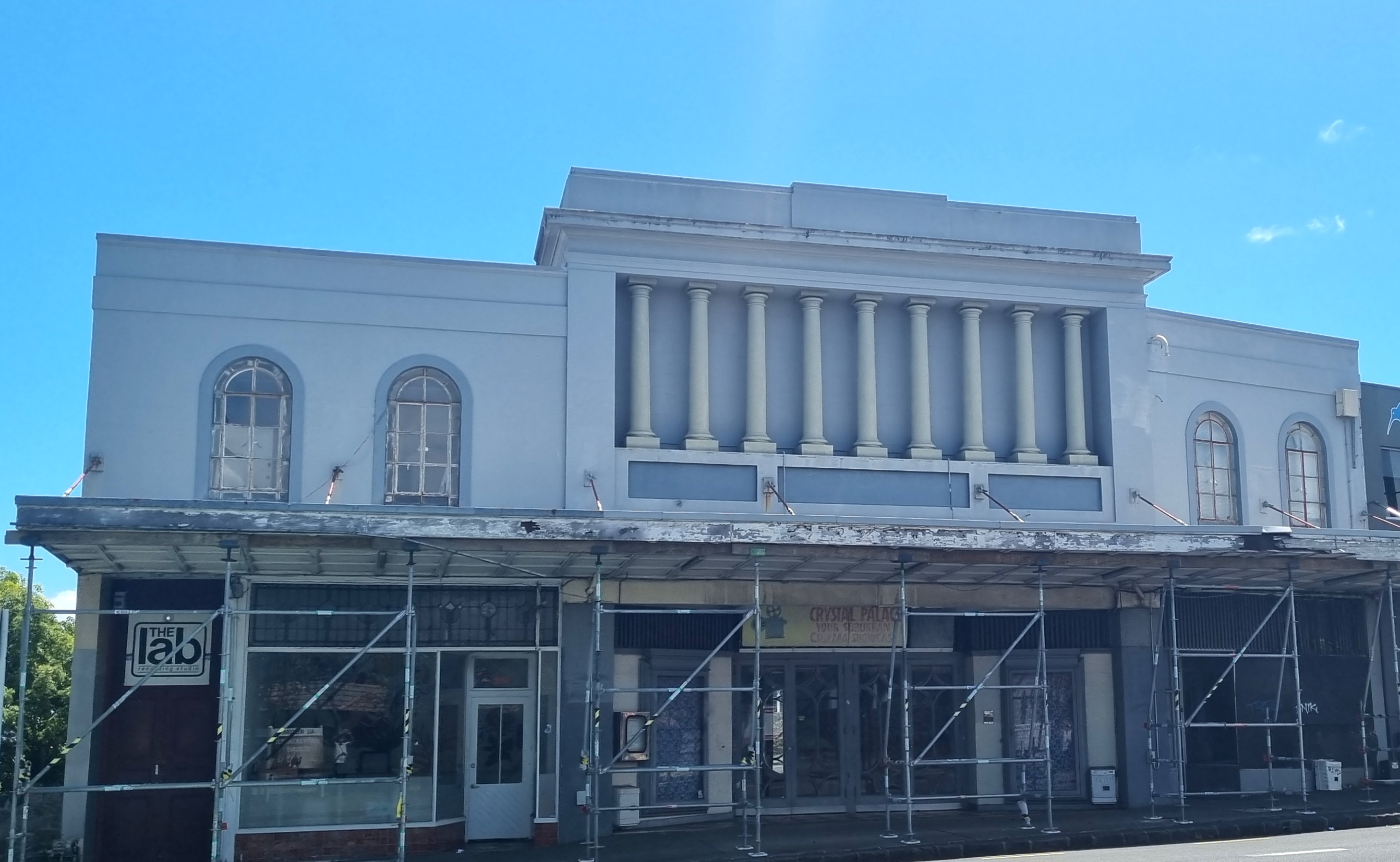
- Crystal Palace Theatre exterior

General information
- Architectural style: Neoclassical
- Location: 535–537 Mt Eden Road, Mount Eden, Auckland, New Zealand
- Coordinates: 36.8856°S 174.7609°E
- Completed: 1928
- Opened: 1929

Heritage New Zealand – Category 2
- Designated: 11 November 1981
- Reference no.: 512

The Crystal Palace Theatre is an early 20th century theatre located in Mount Eden, Auckland, New Zealand listed as a Category 2 building by Heritage New Zealand.

== Description ==
The Crystal Palace is a neoclassical theatre constructed from brick and plaster. The interior of the theatre has a golden trims with large shells decorating it. The theatre has 700 seats. Initially it had1,250 seats. The theatre is built along a slope, this results in a theatre without stairs. Initially the building had an orchestral pit, proscenium, and coloured lighting.

== History ==
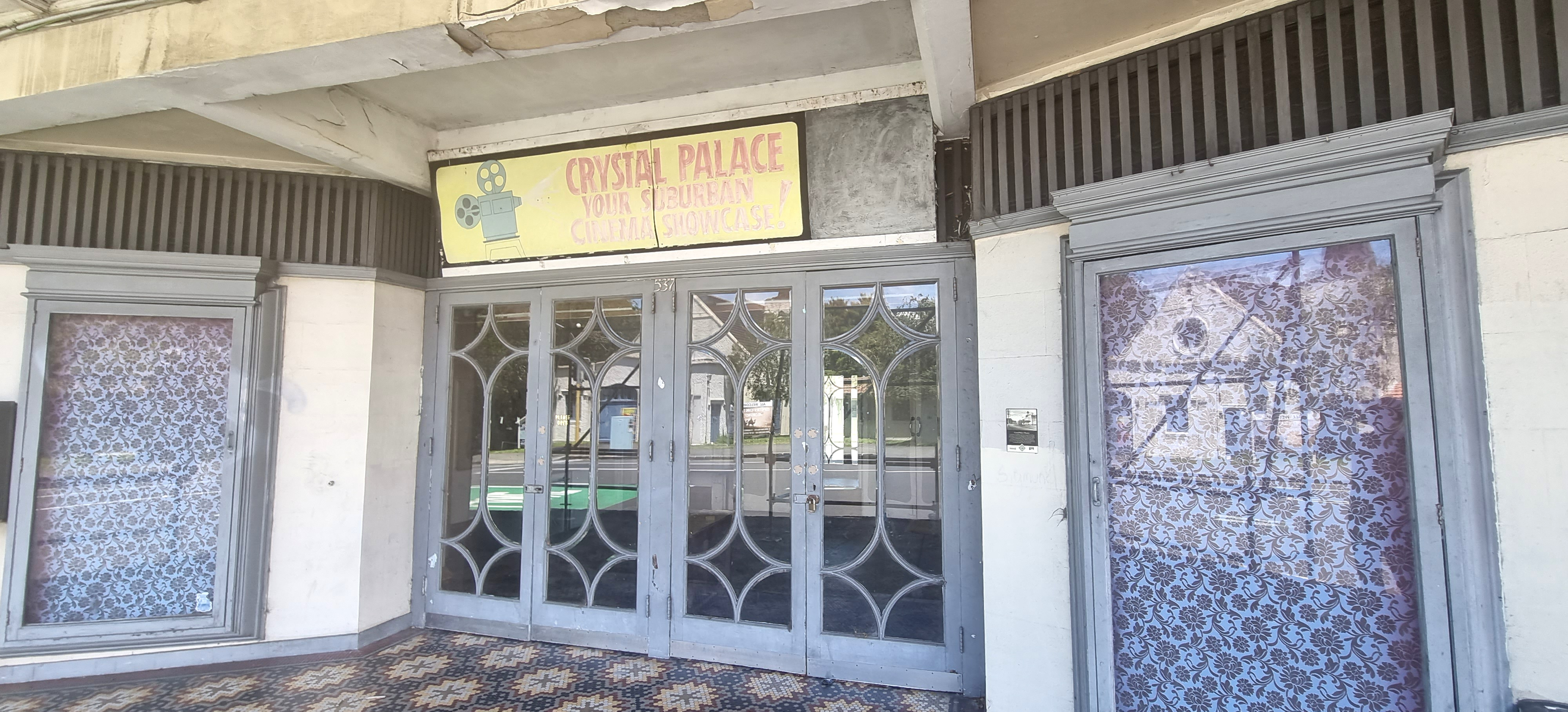
Front of building today

The Crystal Palace Theatre was built in 1928 by contractor N. Cole for the Hippodrome Theatre Company at a cost of £15,000. On 26 January 1929 it opened its doors to the public with a ceremony conducted by the Mayor of Eden Borough. It originally had a cabaret downstairs and a theatre upstairs. The downstairs cabaret also served as a dancehall and was known as the Winter Garden. It would later screen silent films and by August 1929 it had started to show films with sound using speakers imported from America. The first movie screening caused the local power station to short circuit. The theatre had an orchestra to accompany silent films and also showed vaudeville and musicals. The downstairs basement was used for fundraising dances for local sporting groups. This led to Epi Shalfoon running the basement as a dance hall from 1935 to 1944. Shalfoon died on stage in 1953 and his act was replaced with Merv Thomas.

During the Second World War the theatre was used to show films detailing what to do in an emergency and hosted first aid classes.

Since the 1950s the Crystal Palace Theatre has served as a music venue due to the efforts of Phil Warren. Warren would run weekly dances in the downstairs from 1958 to 1973.

During the 1960s Warren applied for a liquor licence as he had hoped to turn the venue into a cabaret and bar. The licence was later declined due to complaints from local residents. Warren had the theatre renovated in 1968 in an attempt to attract more customers. The failure to obtain a liquor license combined with the advent of television and changing social climate resulted in the theatre not being profitable. It was later sold in 1977 to Raman Chhiba, he had proposed the theatre serve as the new venue for the Auckland Indian Association; however, the association decided on another venue and Chhiba decided to purchase the property himself.

Chhiba ran the venue as a cinema and screened Bollywood films alongside mainstream films. Word of mouth spread about the venue and it started hosting special film events to attract cinephiles. One of the more popular events was an interactive screening of The Room, where people would dress up as characters from the film, yell, and throw plastic spoons.

Since 1995 the theatre was rarely opened to the public. It would fully close to the public in 2005 and did not publicly screen another film until 2014.

By the 1980s the downstairs dance hall and cabaret club had closed with the downstairs venue being used as a martial arts club and a photography studio until 1998 when the downstairs area became known as The Lab, a recording studio and area for aspiring local musicians. It has served as a studio for New Zealand musicians throughout the years, including Alistair Deverick. Other notable musicians who have used the studio include Andrew Keoghan, Matt Harvey, Paul Matthews, Elemeno P, and Deja Voodoo. In addition to the recording studio the Crystal Palace has hosted Liam Finn, Lawrence Arabia, Mick Fleetwood and Connan Mockasin.

In 2007 the theatre was given a category B heritage listing by the Auckland City Council.

Taylor MacGregor (nephew of Phil Warren) and Karl Sheridan took over the operation of the theatre in 2016.
