= New Zealand Wars Memorial, Auckland =

New Zealand Wars Memorial
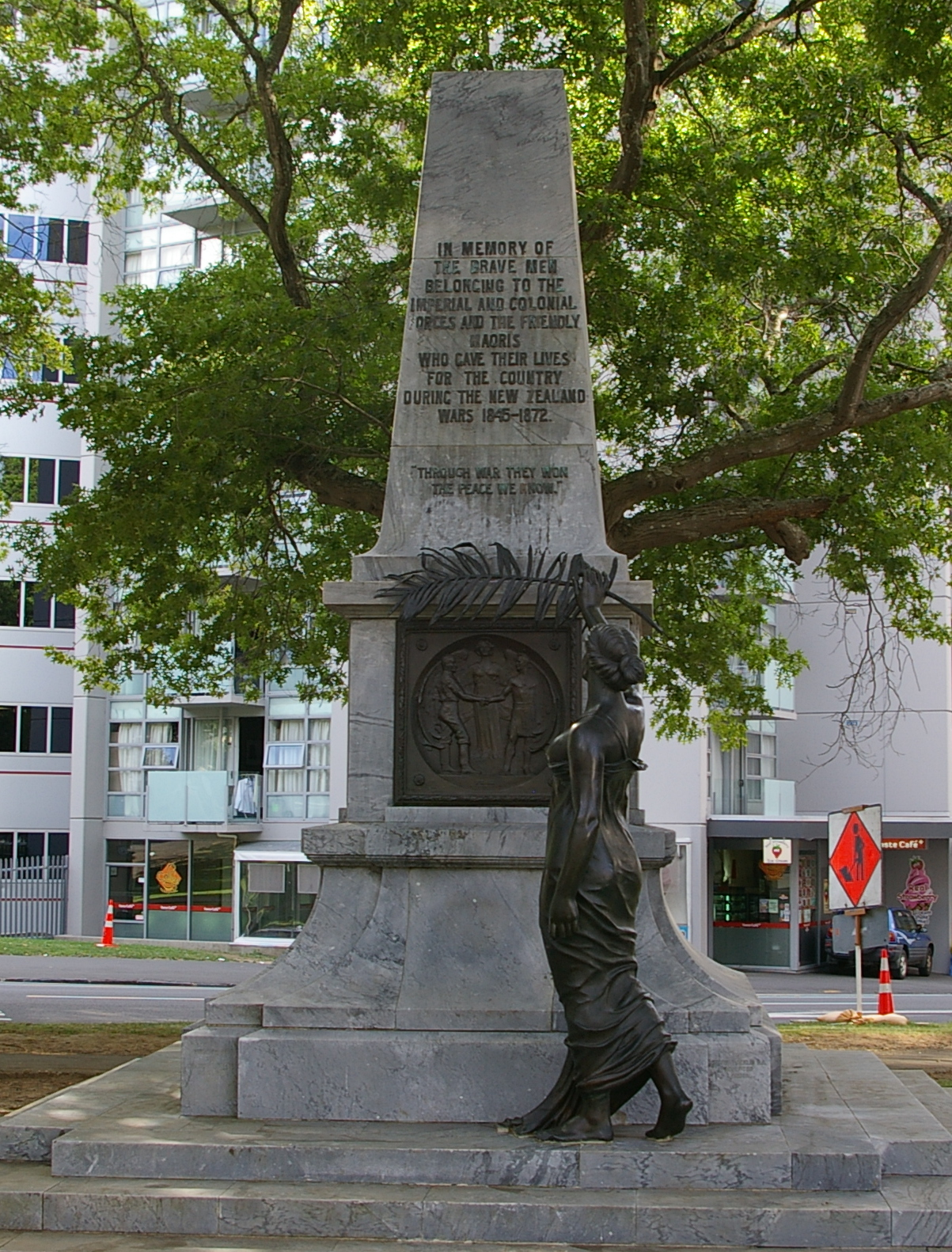
- New Zealand Wars Memorial in 2016
- Interactive map of New Zealand Wars Memorial
- Location: Wakefield Street Reserve, Auckland
- Coordinates: 36°51′20.884″S 174°45′57.751″E
- Designer: Thomas Eyre Macklin
- Material: Marble (Obelisk and Plinth); Bronze (Zealandia sculpture)
- Opening date: 1920

Heritage New Zealand – Category 2
- Designated: 6 June 2005
- Reference no.: 4493

The New Zealand Wars Memorial in Auckland commemorates imperial and Māori troops during the New Zealand Wars who were allied with British forces. The statue was commissioned by the Victoria League and sculpted by Thomas Eyre Macklin. The statue has been the focus of several protests in the late 20th century.

== Background ==
=== Inception ===
The Victoria League was formed shortly after Queen Victoria's death with the guiding message of 'the conservation... of the deeds of British soldiers and sailors, and other patriotic men and women in the Empire.' Edith Statham, the committee secretary of the League, advocated for the erection of a memorial commemorating the New Zealand Wars. Despite her limited knowledge of the conflicts, she supported the project as part of her interest in promoting propaganda in favour of the British Empire.

To achieve their aims, Statham and the Victoria League sought to erect a memorial to all the soldiers, sailors and 'friendly Māori' who died in the New Zealand Wars. In 1911, the Auckland city council offered the league Wakefield Street Reserve as a site for the memorial. This site was offered because of its proximity to the Sir George Grey Statue and the Symonds Street Cemetery where many soldiers are buried. Initially, local architect John Park won a competition to design the statue, which depicted a 'native' kneeling before an imperial soldier. This proposal lapsed because the council wanted a more conspicuous memorial.

Following the lapse of the John Park proposal, the League was forced to go to the government for additional funds. After two years, the government offered £1,000 for the project and another competition was held. The late proposal by British sculptor, Thomas Eyre Macklin, won. Macklin's design involved a stone obelisk with a draped female figure offering a palm to those who died for Empire.

=== Creation ===
According to Heritage New Zealand, dates on the bronze castings indicate that Macklin's work was undertaken in 1915. However, delivery of the castings were delayed by World War One and reached Auckland in 1917. The casts remained in storage until decisions were made to cast them. A local company, W. Parkinson & Co., constructed the obelisk.

== History ==
The memorial was unveiled on 18 August 1920. During the ceremony, the President of the Victoria League, William Napier, handed over the memorial to Auckland's Mayor James Gunson. The obelisk was unveiled by four veterans of the New Zealand Wars: A. Morrow, G. Powley, J. Stichbury and H. Wrigg. According to Colonel Morrow:

The proceedings awakened echoes of a distant past, when the youth and manhood of this province was summoned by the tocsin of war to uphold British rule in this colony which, although then little more than the unspoiled heirloom of the hardy pioneer settlers, was now the brightest sparkling jewel in the British crown.

For many years, the Victoria League marked King's Birthday by placing a wreath at the memorial. However, as attitudes towards empire changed in the late-twentieth century, the memorial's inscription became seen by Māori as outdated and offensive and the memorial became the site of protest. During the 1981 Springbok Tour Protest, the statue was tarred and feathered needing $200 worth of repairs. Two months later, the Zealandia bronze figurine was decapitated coinciding with the Queen's 1981 tour of New Zealand. The statue was subsequently removed by the council and reinstated with a new head in August 2004. The new head was created by Roderick Burgess, who also sculpted the replacement head of the George Grey Statue.

In 2018, the statue was vandalised by an anti-colonial group who spraypainted the obelisk, attached an axe to the statue's head, and placed a protest poster on the plaque.

== Composition ==
The monument consists of a short obelisk mounted on a square plinth, with a life-size bronze statue of Zealandia on its eastern side. The obelisk and plinth are constructed of grey and white Takaka marble.

The inscription on the obelisk facing Symonds Street reads as follows:

In memory of the brave men belonging to the imperial and colonial forces, and the friendly Maoris, who gave their lives for the country during the New Zealand Wars, 1845-1872.

Through the war they won the peace we know.

The statue depicts two bronze plaques. The front plaque facing Symonds Street, titled Peace, depicts a Pākehā male shaking hands with a Māori male enclosed within an angel's wing. The rear plaque, titled Onwards, depicts the old New Zealand coat of arms used between 1911 and 1956.

The statue of Zealandia is a 1.8 bronze-cast female figure dressed in drapery below the breasts. The left hand held a New Zealand flag which drapes over the plinth. The statue's right hand extends outward, originally holding a palm branch that was broken off in 2016.

== Reception ==
The inscription on the statue was criticised by the Auckland Star for implying that the New Zealand Wars ended in 1866, which ignores later conflicts such as Tītokowaru's War and Te Kooti's War. The date was later corrected to reflect that the New Zealand Wars ended in 1872.

== Gallery ==
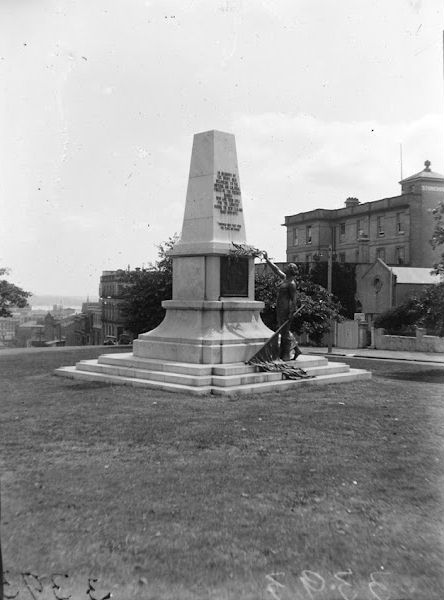
The statue in the 1920s

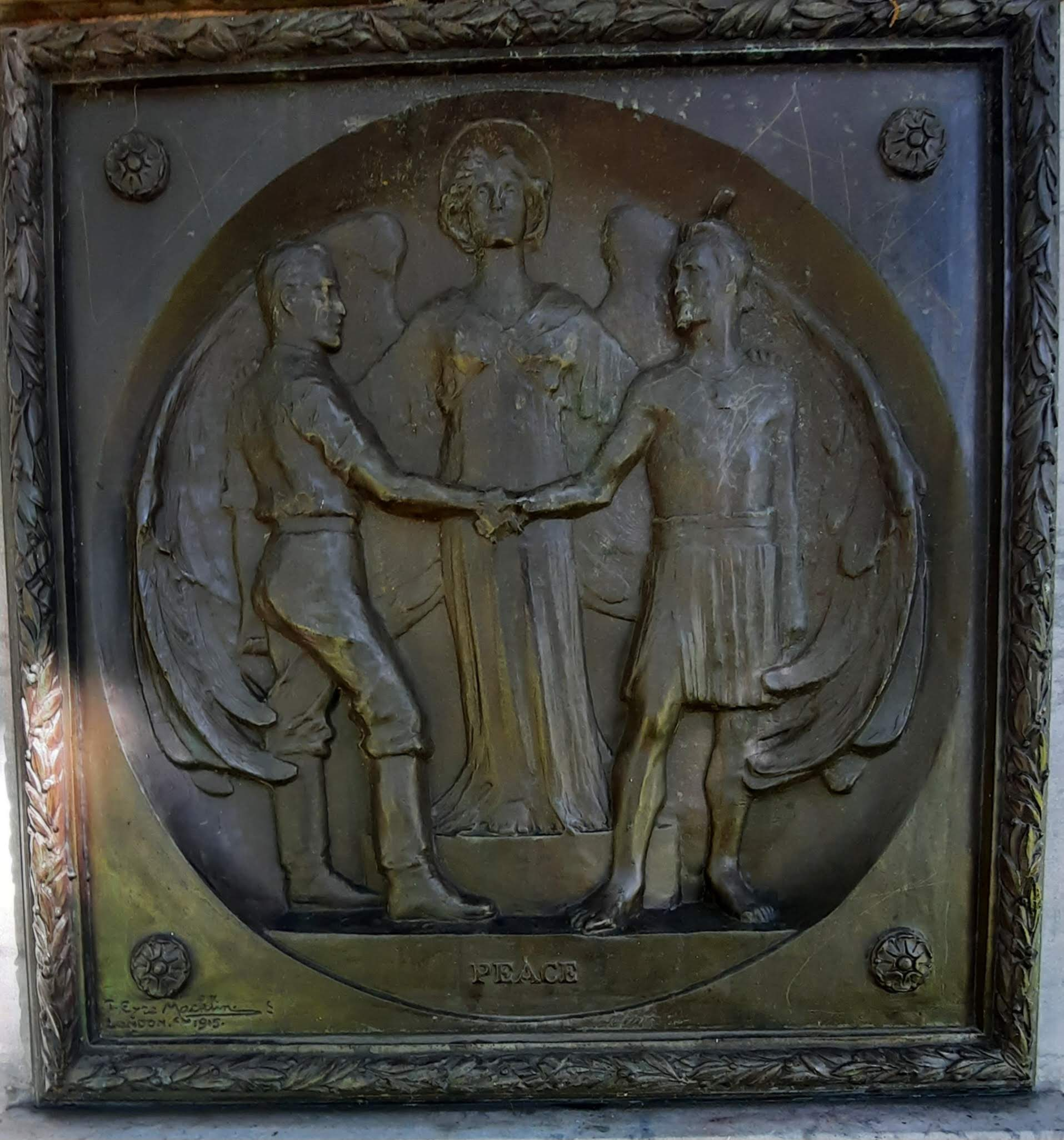
Front plaque

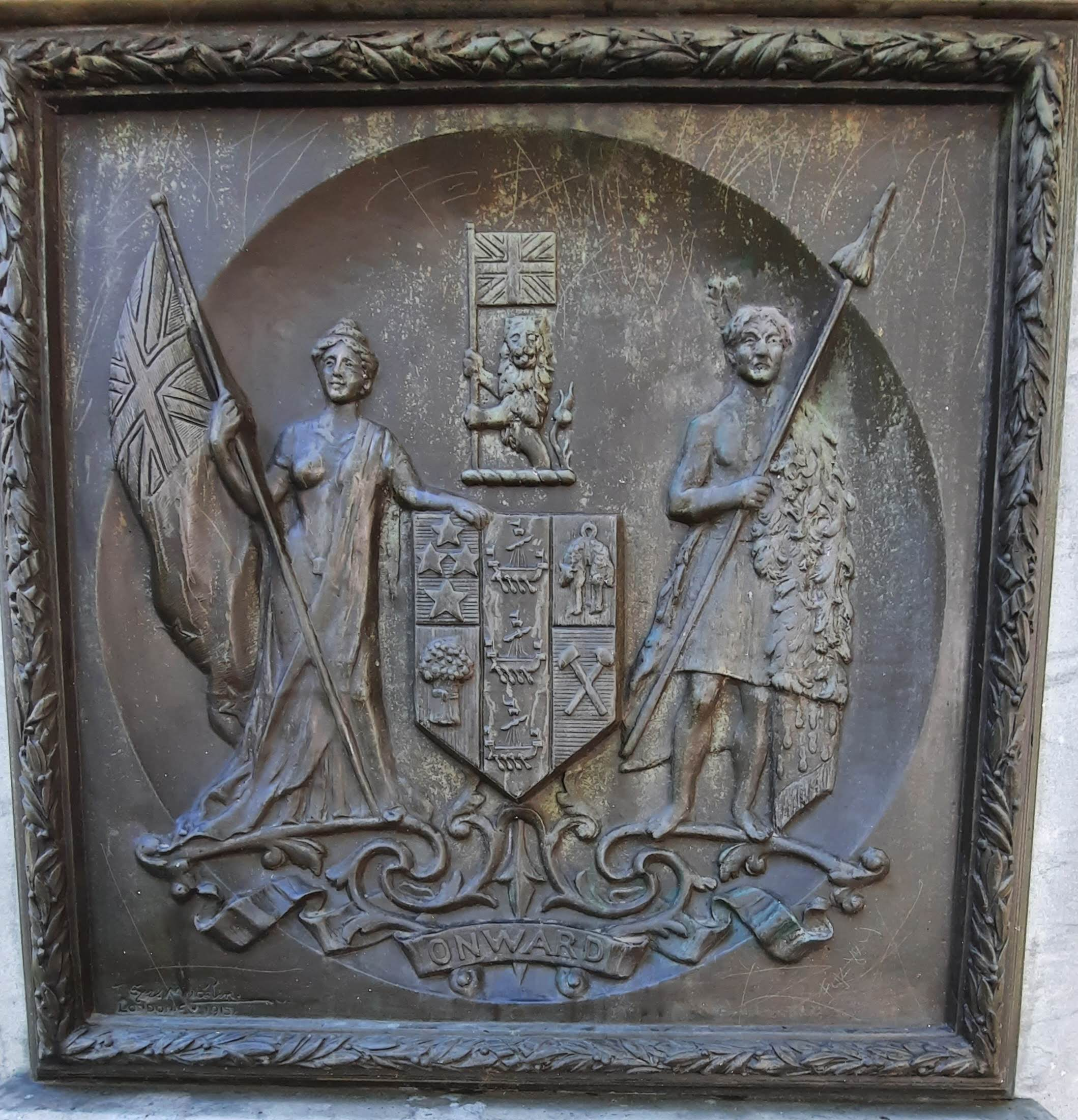
Rear plaque
