= Benjamin Lancaster =

Benjamin Lancaster (1 December 1801 – 16 March 1887) was a 19th-century businessman and philanthropist. He was born in 1801, married Rosamira Bellairs on 5 June 1851 at Bedworth, Warwickshire, and died in Bournemouth in 1887 leaving an estate valued at £137,584 4s 2d.

In 1830 he jointly founded Price's Patent Candle Company Ltd, which became the world's largest manufacturer of candles. In the 1850s he invested in land in Canterbury, New Zealand and gave his name to the Lancaster Park cricket ground.

In 1861 Mr and Mrs Lancaster founded the Community of St Peter in Kilburn to nurse women and children and carry out mission work. After St Peter's Home in Kilburn was destroyed in the Second World War the Community transferred its mother house to Woking, where it now runs a retreat house.
