= Ockleston House =

- Ockleston House in 2008
- Interactive map of the Ockleston House area
- Alternative names: Field House/Field Cottage

General information
- Architectural style: Vernacular
- Location: 130 Hobsonville Road, Hobsonville
- Coordinates: 36.7955°S 174.6507°E
- Named for: James Ockleston
- Year built: 1885 (original cottage)

Ockleston House was a historic house in Hobsonville, Auckland, New Zealand. Constructed in the 19th century as a cottage it was expanded over the years into a large house. During the construction of the Upper Harbour Motorway the property was demolished. Prior to demolition it was dismantled carefully for archaeological evaluation.

== Description ==
Ockleston House was originally a small cottage but over the years had extensions and changes that substantially altered the design. Prior to demolition the house had fallen into desuetude. The house was cladded with timber weatherboards and the interior was all timber. This was primarily kauri but a bungalow-styled addition used black pine and rimu. The roof was corrugated iron and there were two brick chimneys. The gables were all of different lengths. The windows were mostly double hung sash windows with two awning windows and a single louvre window.

The original cottage was 25 ft (7.6 m) by 20 ft (6.1 m) with an 8 ft (2.4 m) high ceiling. Constructed entirely from kauri, with the quality of kauri varying based on how important the part of the structure was—common practice for the period. It had a kitchen, living room, hall, and a bedroom. A verandah was located at the front. A light green paint was used for the interior woodwork and a creamy colour for the exterior. The front had rusticated weatherboards and the rear had plain lapped boards. The roof was a red-oxide corrugated iron roof. The simple nature of the cottage may have been due to George Field's Methodist faith.

Ockleston House had four bedrooms, a kitchen, dining room, a living room, garage, bathroom and hallway. A porch served as the entrance to the home and hallway. A lean-to wash house was located next to the bathroom.

The doors showed many different styles illustrating how the house was expanded and modified over the years. Some doors were modern and others represented styles from the 19th century. The kitchen door was ornate with glass panes.

There were three fire places all of different styles, one had been sealed off by 2008. The living room was brick, the dining room plaster, and the bedroom cast-iron.

The original flooring was made from hand-planed kauri tongue-and-groove boards.

The support structure for the septic tank served as a shed. It was constructed from earthquake-proof ceramic blocks from Clark's pottery works.

16 different wallpapers were identified during the archaeological assessment of the building, including 2 that dated back to the original cottage. Most wallpapers had a floral design.

== History ==
=== Background ===
==== Land ownership ====
Following the purchase of the Waipareira block in 1853, the area that would become Hobsonville was divided into four allotments. Allotment 2 came to be owned by Peter Robertson. Robertson subdivided the allotment in 1864. Lot 45 of the subdivision was purchased by James Coupland. Coupland sold lot 45 to George Alfred Field in 1885 for £30. Lots 44 and 46 were owned by Joshua Ockleston. Ockleston sold lot 46 to Field who later sold it and lot 45 to John Knight. Knight sold both lot 45 and 46 to James Ockleston (son of John Ockleston) in February 1900. The property remained in the Ockleston family until c. 1972 when it was purchased by the Waitemata City Council.

==== Ockleston family ====
In 1864 Joshua Ockleston arrived in New Zealand from England. He purchased land in 1877, 4 years after his marriage. Joshua farmed this land until his death in 1896. Richard Ockleston took over management of the farm following his father's death. James Sim and William established a pottery in 1903 near the Waiarohia Creek. It amalgamated with Rice Owen Clark II's pottery in 1908–1909.

=== Ockleston House ===
The original Field Cottage was built upon timber piles and bricks in 1885. The bricks were likely obtained from the nearby potteries for low cost as the bricks were unsuitable for market as many contained imperfections.

In 1900 James Ockleston purchased George Alfred Field's cottage. This cottage was expanded and heavily modified and eventually no longer resembled the original cottage.

During the first major expansion and modification of the property the rear wall was removed, the kitchen expanded, a large bedroom with fireplace was added, and a lean-to was built. The rear wall of the cottage was removed to accommodate this.

The second major expansion involved adding two 19th-century cottages onto the property.

The third major expansion and modification was bungalow-styled and involved the addition of a living room, hall, porch, bedroom, bathroom, and new kitchen. These were constructed from rimu and matai instead of kauri. This expansion likely took place c.1917. With certainty it was between 1900 and 1921. The fireplace design is of a style around 1917 and the property was reported to have been used to treat those who had caught the Spanish flu. During this modification a septic tank with sewage pipes was installed.

Ockleston House was purchased by the Waitemata City Council in the 1970s and was subsequently tenanted until 2008.

=== Demolition ===
Ockleston House was located along the path of the new Upper Harbour Motorway. Initial plans were for relocation to Clarks Lane but the poor state of the building led to the decision to demolition it.

Prior to demolition an archaeological assessment was carried out and this involved a meticulous dismantling of the building.

The archaeological assessment looked at many different parts of the building to date features and extensions. Seven different types of nails were used in the building. These are: ewebank, rose-head, rhomboidal, oval, flat, roofing, and hessian scrim nails. Some of these help to date parts of the building.

Analysis from the University of Auckland of 94 kauri timber samples showed that the kauri used in construction dates from AD 1453 to 1892. The latest felling date for timber used in the original construction was 1882/1883, with that timber potentially having been surplus from the Hobsonville Church.

Numerous ceramics and glassware were discovered in rubbish pits.
