= Clark House (New Zealand) =

Heritage building in Auckland, New Zealand

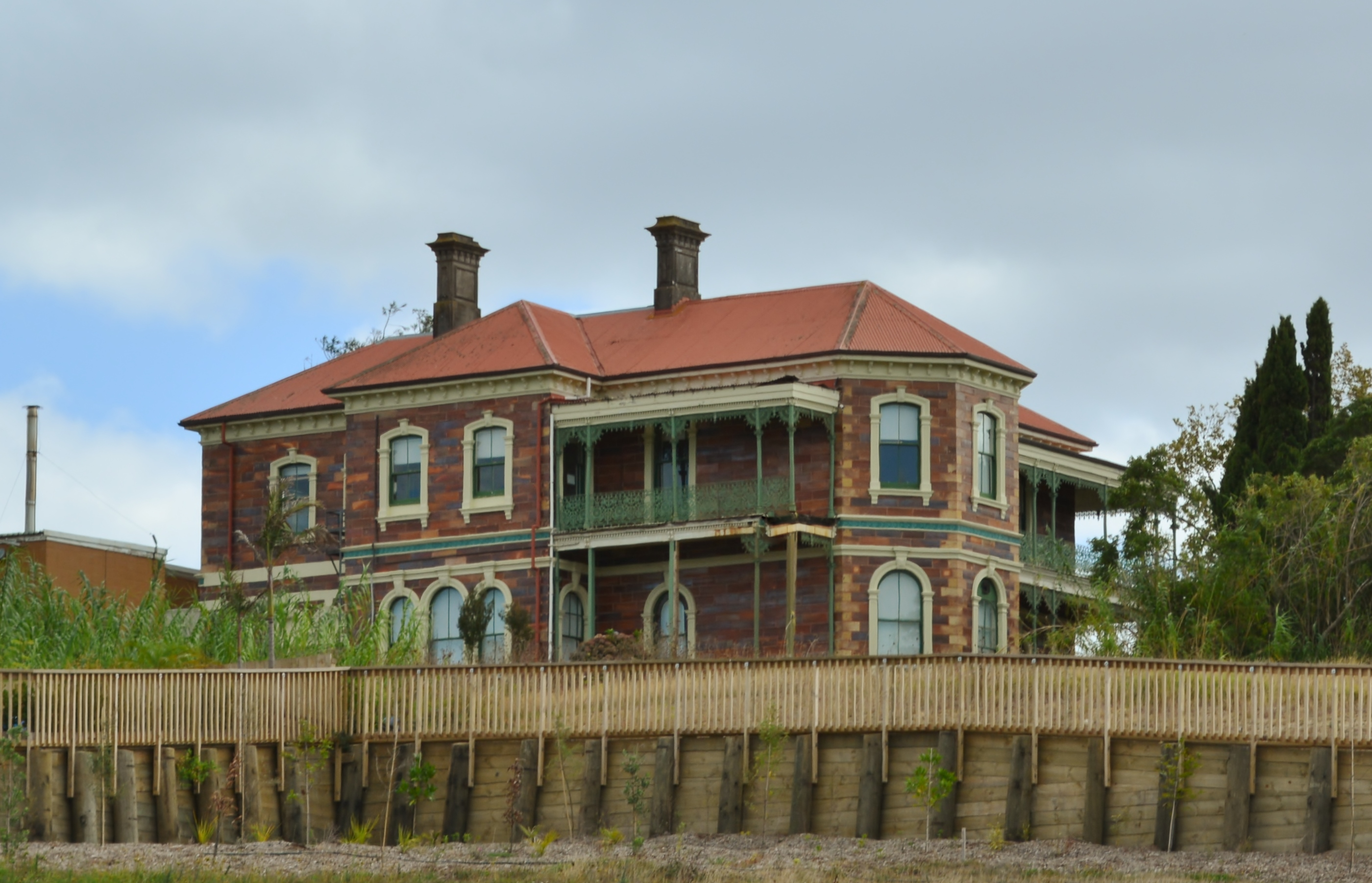
- Clark House from the rear
- Interactive map of the Clark House area
- Etymology: Named after owner

General information
- Type: Private home
- Architectural style: Italianate
- Location: Hobsonville, 25–29 Clark Road, Auckland, New Zealand
- Coordinates: 36.7993°S 174.6516°E
- Current tenants: Royal New Zealand Air Force
- Year built: c. 1897–1902
- Owner: The Crown

Technical details
- Size: 723 square metres (7,780 ft^{2})

Design and construction
- Architect: Rice Owen Clark II

Heritage New Zealand – Category 1
- Designated: 6 June 1990
- Reference no.: 126

Clark House is an early 20th century Italianate home in Hobsonville, Auckland, New Zealand, listed as a Category I building by Heritage New Zealand. Construction on the house began in the late 1890s as the family home for Rice Owen Clark II, a wealthy owner of a nearby pottery business. Clark House is unique in being constructed from hollow ceramic blocks, a technique invented by Thomas Edwin Clark.

== Description ==
Clark House is a two-storey villa that looks out over Limeburners Bay and the Waitematā Harbour. The interior contains a curved staircase, stained glass windows, Art Nouveau dado panels, kauri wood features and decorative tiles. According to Heritage New Zealand Clark House was the first residence in New Zealand to use hollow ceramic blocks, before hollow concrete blocks were used.

== History ==
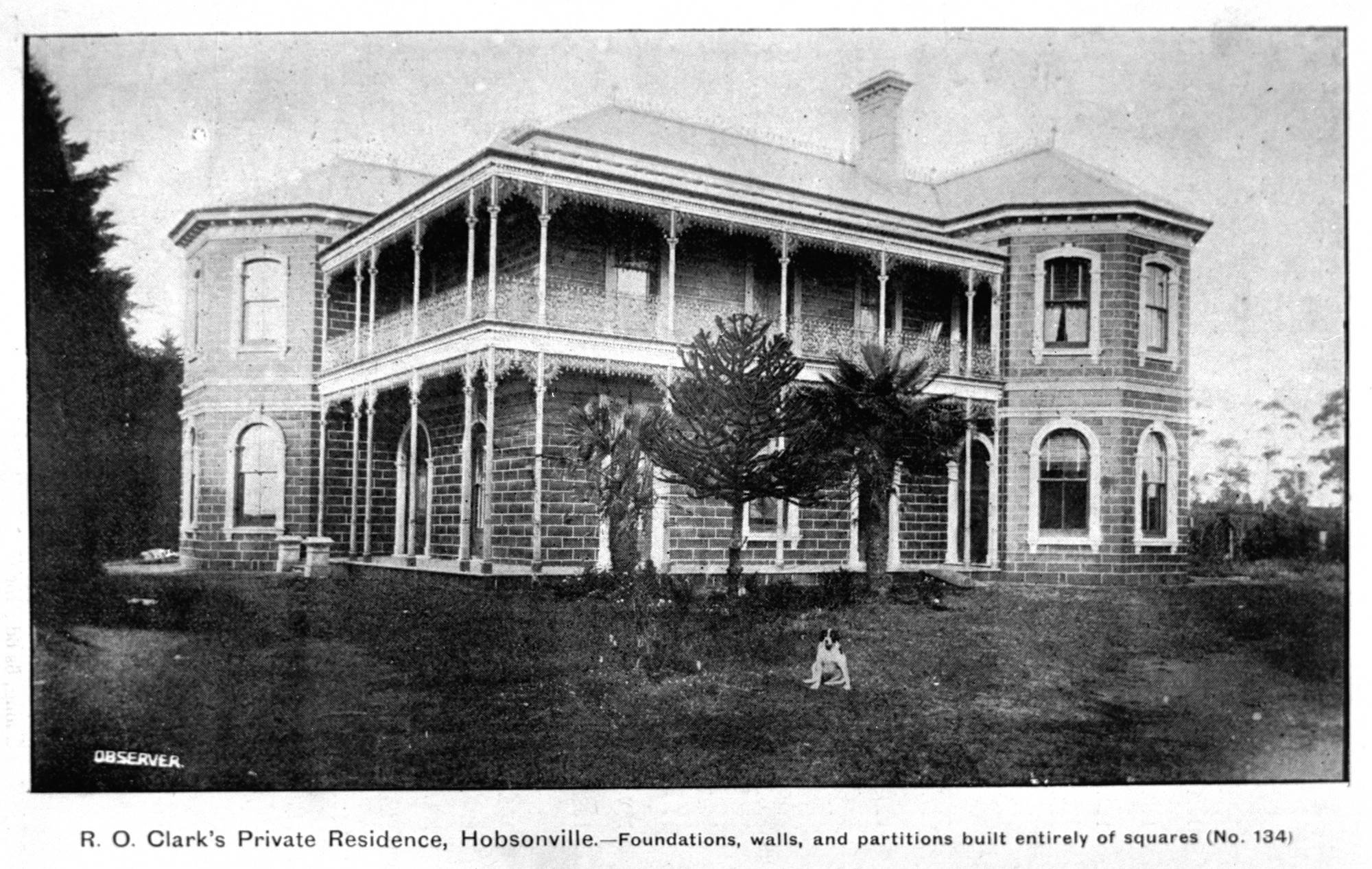
Clark House in 1905

=== Background ===
The first settler was Rice Owen Clark, who bought 139 acres of land there in 1854. Clark's first home was located on Gunn's Point to the east of the site of Clark House. Clark found the land too wet to farm easily, so he started making drainage pipes from clay found there. By 1877 he had acquired more land, part of which would later become the Clark House residence. Clark initially made the pipes to drain his own property, then also to fill requests from other Hobsonville settlers. By 1862 he had expanded his operations, and in 1864 his pottery company had been officially established. In 1876 Rice Owen Clark II, at the age of 21, began working alongside his father on the business. By 1879 Clark's and other local potteries had made local headlines, and the area of Limeburners Bay became well associated with the pottery industry. Despite the Long Depression forcing many nearby pottery businesses to close, Clark's pottery, under the ownership of Rice Owen Clark II, continued to produce ceramics and was boasting about being the largest pottery works in New Zealand.

=== Construction ===
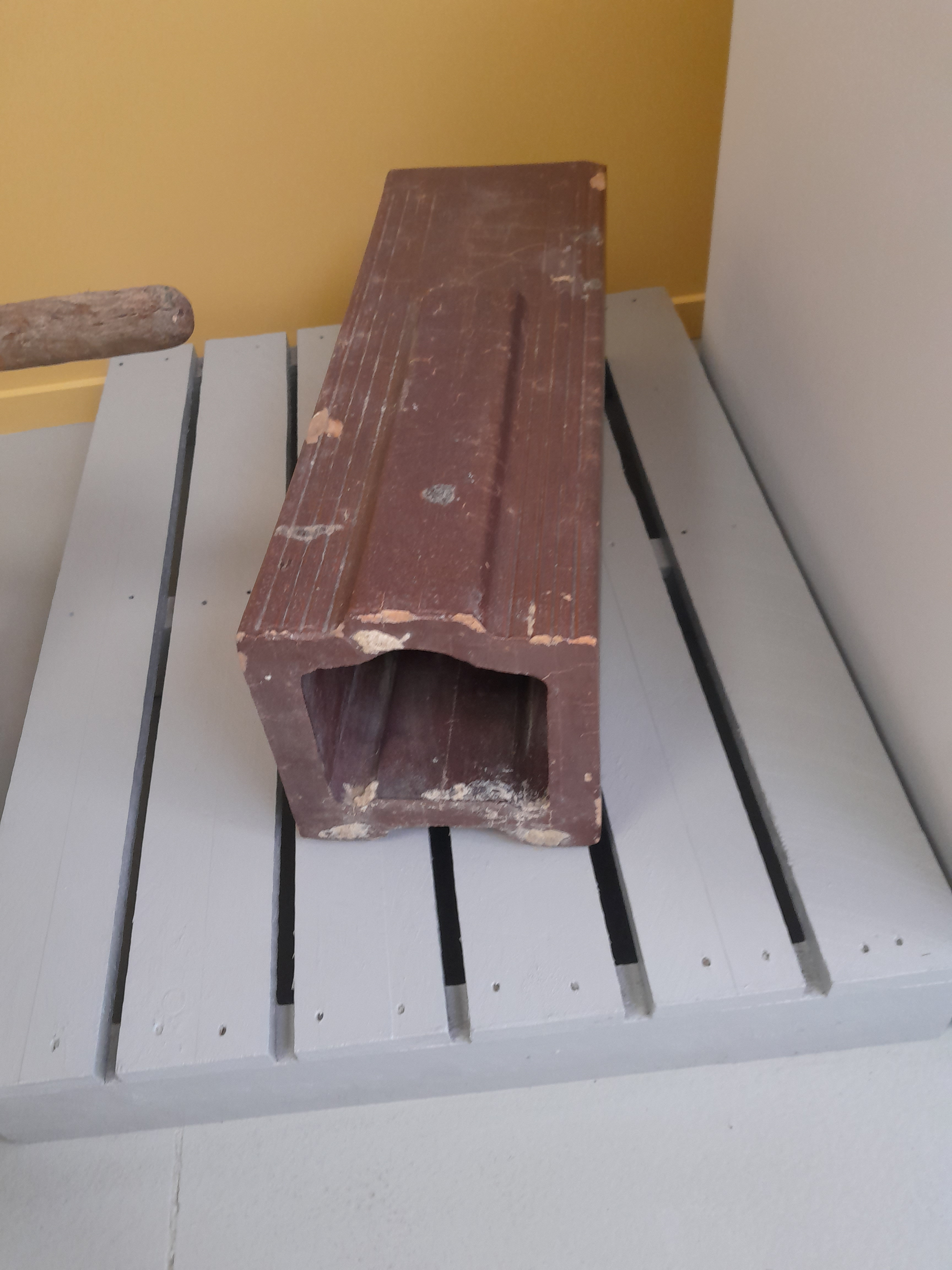
A block taken from Clark Cottage. Clark House uses similar blocks

After Clark died in 1896, Clark II became sole owner of the business. He decided to build a home out of oblong ceramic blocks — hoping this would become a new building trend — and named the home "Ngaroma". Thomas Edwin Clark, Clark's son, had pioneered the innovative technique. Construction started c.1897, and by 1902 the house was completed. The hollow ceramic blocks did not catch on, as cinder blocks would come to New Zealand shortly after. Only a few houses, mostly in Hobsonville, would use the material and by 1909 Clark Patents Block Ltd had closed.

After Clark II died in 1905, the business and property was inherited by his sons Thomas Edwin Clark and Rice Owen Clark III. They continued work on the business and property, with two new chimneys being built between 1905 and 1908. In 1909 Clark III left the company to his brother.

Starting in the 1920s the clay at Limeburners Bay had started running low. In 1929 Clark's Pottery had merged with other companies to become the Amalgamated Brick and Tile Company, which would later become Ceramco. Due to the lack of clay and difficulty in transporting goods via the harbour, the operations at Limeburners Bay were closed in 1931.

=== Royal New Zealand Air Force ===
In 1950, the Crown purchased Clark House for £8,000 on behalf of the Royal New Zealand Air Force (RNZAF). The RNZAF used Clark House for Cold War meetings, hosting the South East Asia Treaty Organisation conference at the property in 1955. From 1967, after a decompression chamber had been installed, it housed the Aviation Medicine Unit. The property remained in use by the Defence Force until 2016. In 2022, the RNZAF put the property on the market.

== Other buildings ==
Although the technique pioneered by Clark did not take off it was used in a number of buildings in Hobsonville and at least two outside of Hobsonville.

The extant buildings in Hobsonville include the Boarding and Engineer's House and Clark Cottage. Outside of Hobsonville the Warkworth Town Hall and Rodney County Council offices in Warkworth were constructed with the blocks. The latter was demolished.
