= Jackie Clark (philanthropist) =

New Zealand charity founder

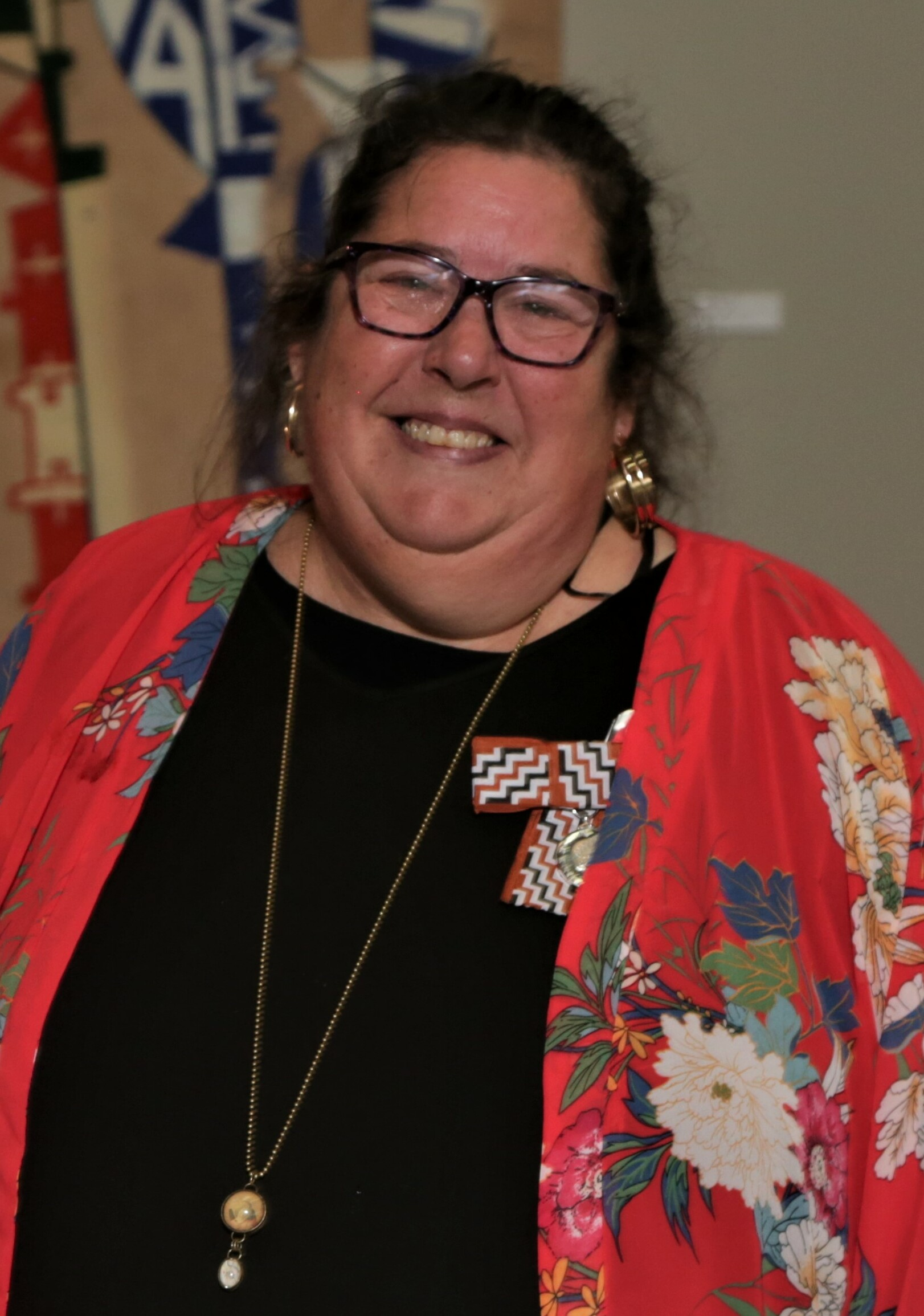
Clark, following her investiture in May 2019

Jackie Clark QSM (born 1964) is a New Zealand philanthropist and advocate for women. She established The Aunties, a charity helping vulnerable women and children who have experienced domestic violence.

== Biography ==
Clark was born in Grey Lynn's Bethany Hospital, owned by her great-grandmother, and raised in Takapuna. She was one of ten children; her mother Patricia (née France) was her father Tom's third wife.

When Clark was 12 years old she left home for boarding school at her own request; she attended Samuel Marsden Collegiate School in Wellington. She spent her last year of high school at Rangitoto College and then studied art and Southeast Asian history at University of Auckland. After graduating in 1986 she went overseas and lived in England, France and Switzerland before returning to New Zealand.

Back in New Zealand, Clark studied for a teaching qualification and became a kindergarten teacher. Her first jobs were in low-income neighbourhoods -Otara and Owiraka - where she witnessed issues of poverty, crime, violence, drugs and alcohol and generational trauma first-hand.

While working at a kindergarten in Mangere, Clark began to donate lost property from the kindergarten to the local women's refuge. She visited the refuge's safe houses and met women living there, and began to help with more specific needs. She created lists of items needed by the women and their children, shared these on social media, collected items and delivered them to the houses. Clark gathered other women to help her and the group became known as The Aunties in 2013. She later resigned her job, sold her house and moved to Manurewa, south Auckland, so she could run the charity full-time.

In 2018 Clark was awarded a Queen's Service Medal for services to women. The same year, she won two awards at the New Zealand Women of Influence Awards: Supreme Award and Community and Not-for-Profit.

In 2021, Clark launched a book of stories by survivors of domestic violence, told in their own voices, Her Say.

== Personal life ==
Clark met her husband Ian in 1991 and they married shortly after. He was diagnosed with leukaemia in 1996 and died on 31 December 2018 of liver failure.

Clark's great-great-grandfather was Rice Owen Clark, and her father was Sir Tom Clark, founders of the Crown Lynn ceramics business. Clark has spoken about the family legacy of industrial success.
