= Clark Cottage (New Zealand) =

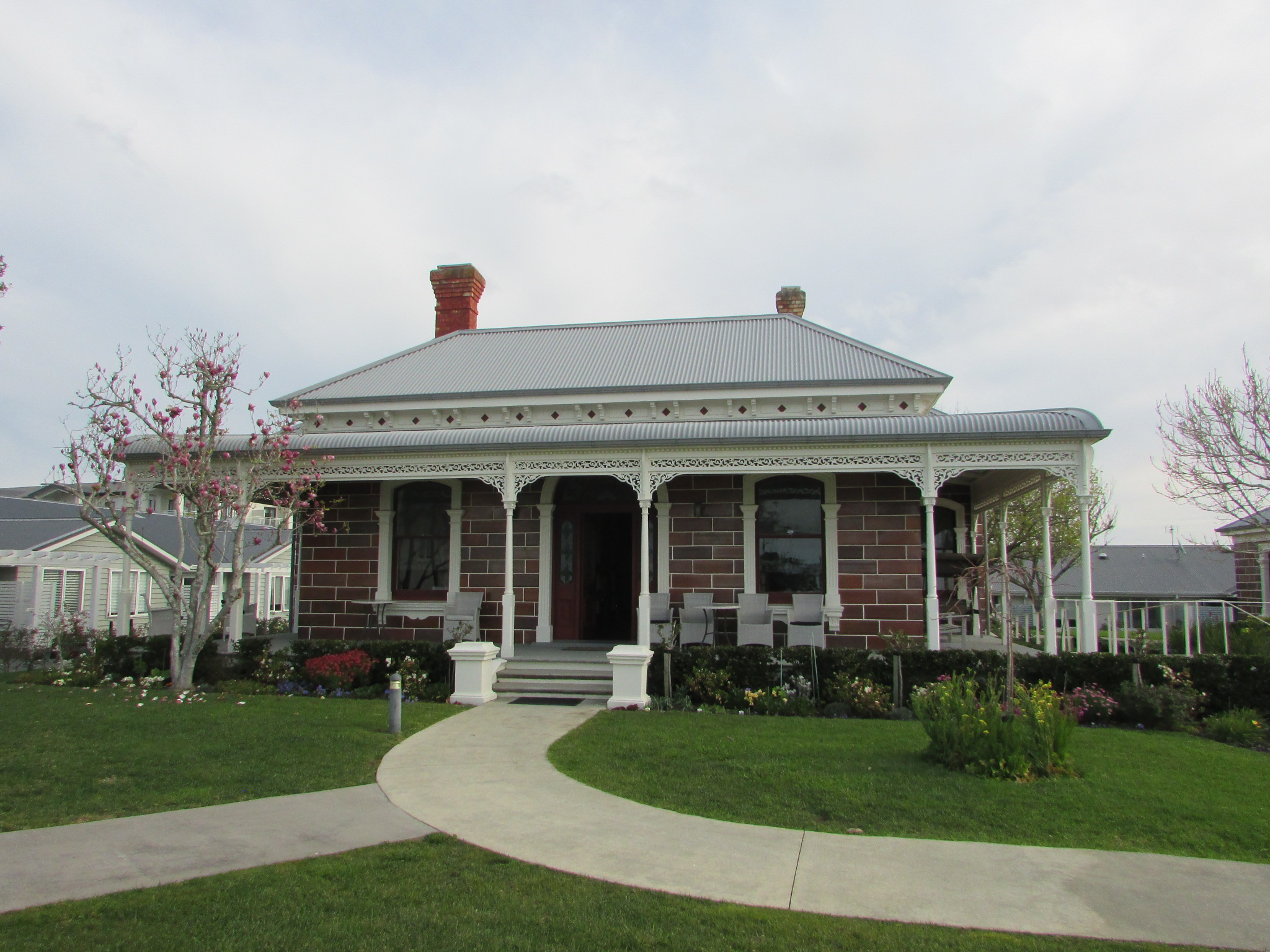
- Front of Clark Cottage

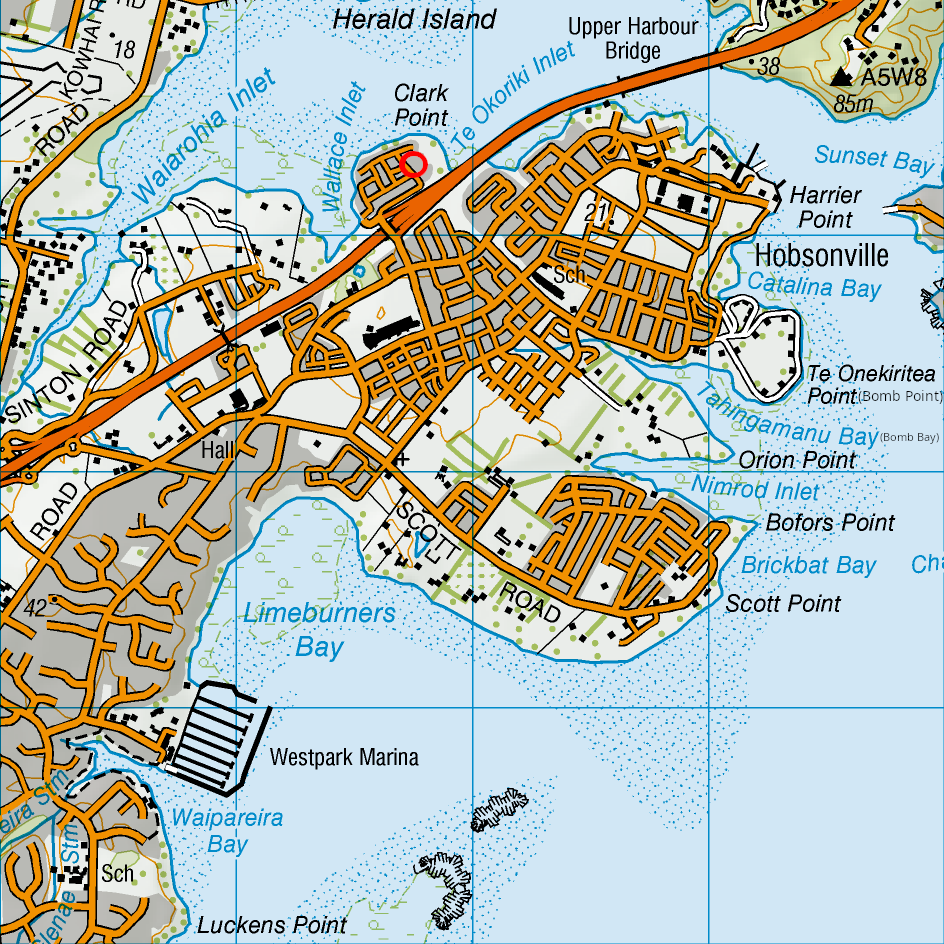
- Map of Hobsonville with location of Clark Cottage circled
- Former names: Love Cottage
- Alternative names: Duke House

General information
- Architectural style: Italianate, Art Nouveau (some interior designs)
- Location: Monterey Park,, 2 Squadron Drive, Hobsonville
- Coordinates: 36.788374°S 174.655876°E
- Named for: Thomas Edwin Clark
- Year built: c.1908

Clark Cottage, also known as Duke House, is an early 20th century historic ceramic brick villa located in Hobsonville, Auckland.

Clark Cottage is significant for being constructed with hollow ceramic blocks, a technique pioneered by Thomas Edwin Clark. This technique is only found in three other extant buildings. Clark Cottage is also significant for its connection to the Clark family, who established a large pottery work in Hobsonville.

== Description ==
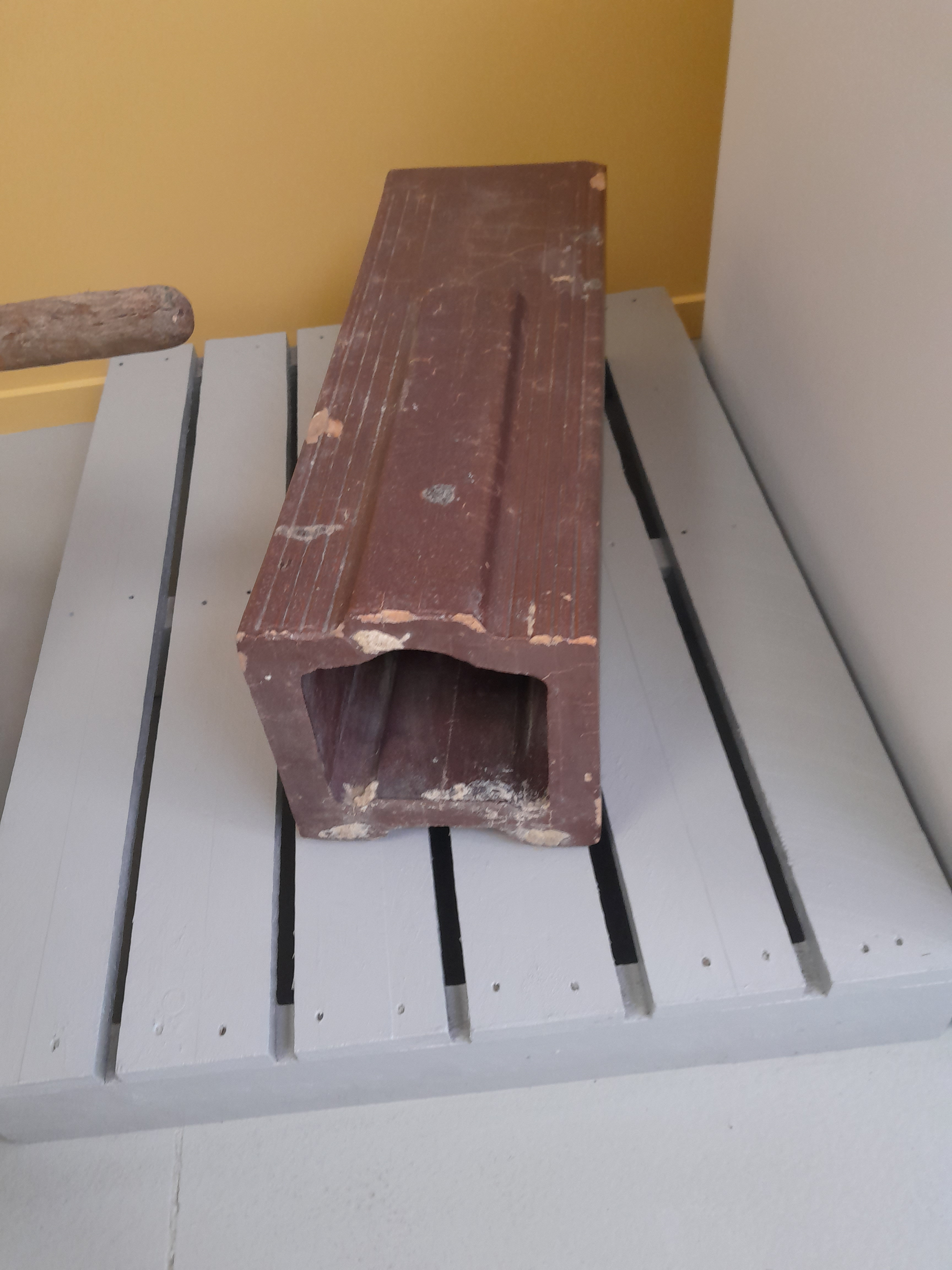
A block taken from Clark Cottage

Clark Cottage is a single-storey Italianate villa with a large verandah at the front. The cottage and creamery were constructed with hollow bricks invented by Thomas Edwin Clark. The bricks measure 658mm x 214mm.

The front door opens up to a central hallway which carries through all the way to the rear door and verandah. A timber arch separates the hall in half. The first left room is a small bedroom that features a fireplace. The second left room is a large living room. The living room has a large fireplace and pressed steel dado rail with an Art Nouveau design. The first room on the right is the main bedroom. The second room on the right is the bathroom. The third room on the right is the kitchen which also has a pantry and scullery. There are two brick chimneys that support the two fireplaces. The creamery also has a chimney.

The exterior verandah is beneath a bullnose roof. The beam has dentils whilst below it are fretwork laces. The posts have fretwork brackets connecting it. The posts have Corinthian capitals below the brackets. Between the roof and verandah are modillions and adorning the space between those are a painted red diamond shape. It extends around to the northern side and a separate verandah with the same detailing is located at the back.

The front door has a stained glass fanlight above with stained glass side panel windows. A plaster pilaster surrounds the door frame and the double hung sash windows located on each side of the door.

The interior has ornate moulded timber finishings and pressed metal ceilings with cornices and frieze. The ceiling uses an Art Nouveau design. The ceiling in the front hall is a fibreglass copy of the original. The hall has Anaglyptic paper finishings below a timber dado rail.

A creamery built in the same style is near the cottage. The creamery is sometimes referred to as a servant's quarter. The creamery has two rooms.

A Magnolia tree located in front of the property was likely planted in 1908 by Margaret Clark.

== History ==
The land where Clark Cottage is situated was originally owned by Reverend David Bruce who later subdivided the land in July, 1891. Harry Cater had a 109.5 acres (44.3 ha) farm on the site in 1893. Rice Owen Clark II obtained the property on 20 June 1895.

The date of construction is unknown but it is before 15 July 1909 and likely after 23 April 1908. Thomas Edwin Clark, the owner and resident of Clark Cottage was married to Margaret Morrison on 23 April and the cottage was originally known as 'Love Cottage', suggesting construction after his marriage. Some evidence points to a property being built between 1870–1880s but when Reverend Bruce subdivided the land he reported it as being unoccupied.

Thomas transferred the title to his wife on 7 August 1909. Thomas would move into Clark House in 1911 following his mother's move to Auckland. The cottage was later subdivided and sold to William Henry Madill, with some of the subdivided land going to the Clark's family business. Madill later had the title transferred to William Otto.

Otto had part of the southern wall moved to create a dormitory for his children. The Ottos continued to hold the property until 1933 when Harry Barnes purchased it at a mortgagee sale.

James Stirling Duke obtained the property in 1971, which at the time was 5 hectares (12 acres). He used the property as a stud farm for Suffolk sheep. Duke named his property Monterey Park after the Monterey pines in the area. The dormitory was removed by Duke who recreated the south wall using the original bricks.

In 1986 the property was purchased by Michael and Ann Evans. The Evans founded the Monterey Park Motor Museum and Model World on the site and continued restoration work on the cottage started by Duke, including rebuilding the rear verandah which was removed by the Ottos.

== Restoration ==
Following purchase of the land by Summerset Holdings for a retirement village, Clark Cottage underwent a 9-month renovation at a cost of NZ$1.7 million. The bricks had to be taken out and replaced individually to restore the cottage. The Summerset Group won an award for their restoration of the building.

== Gallery ==
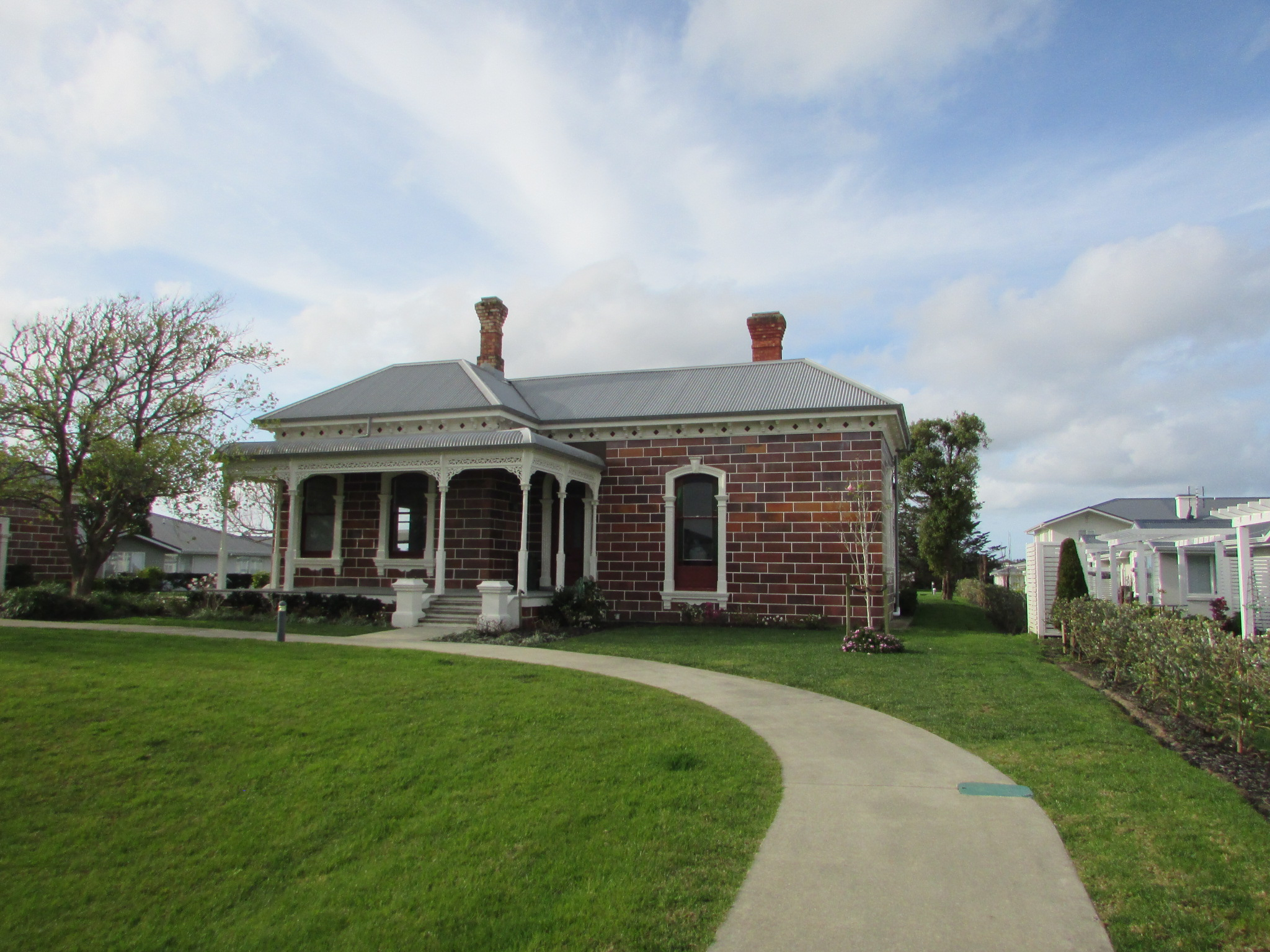
Rear of Clark Cottage

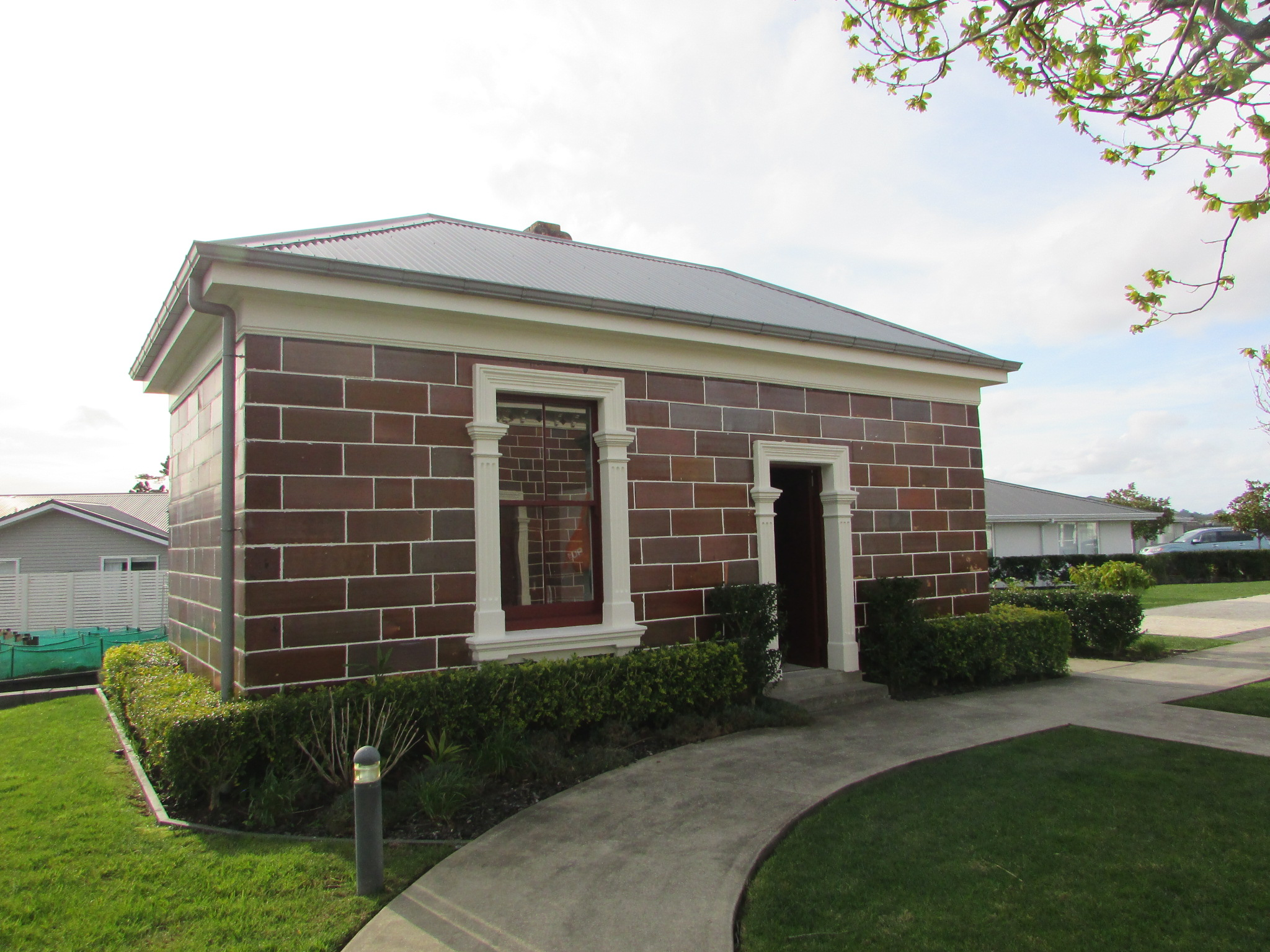
The creamery

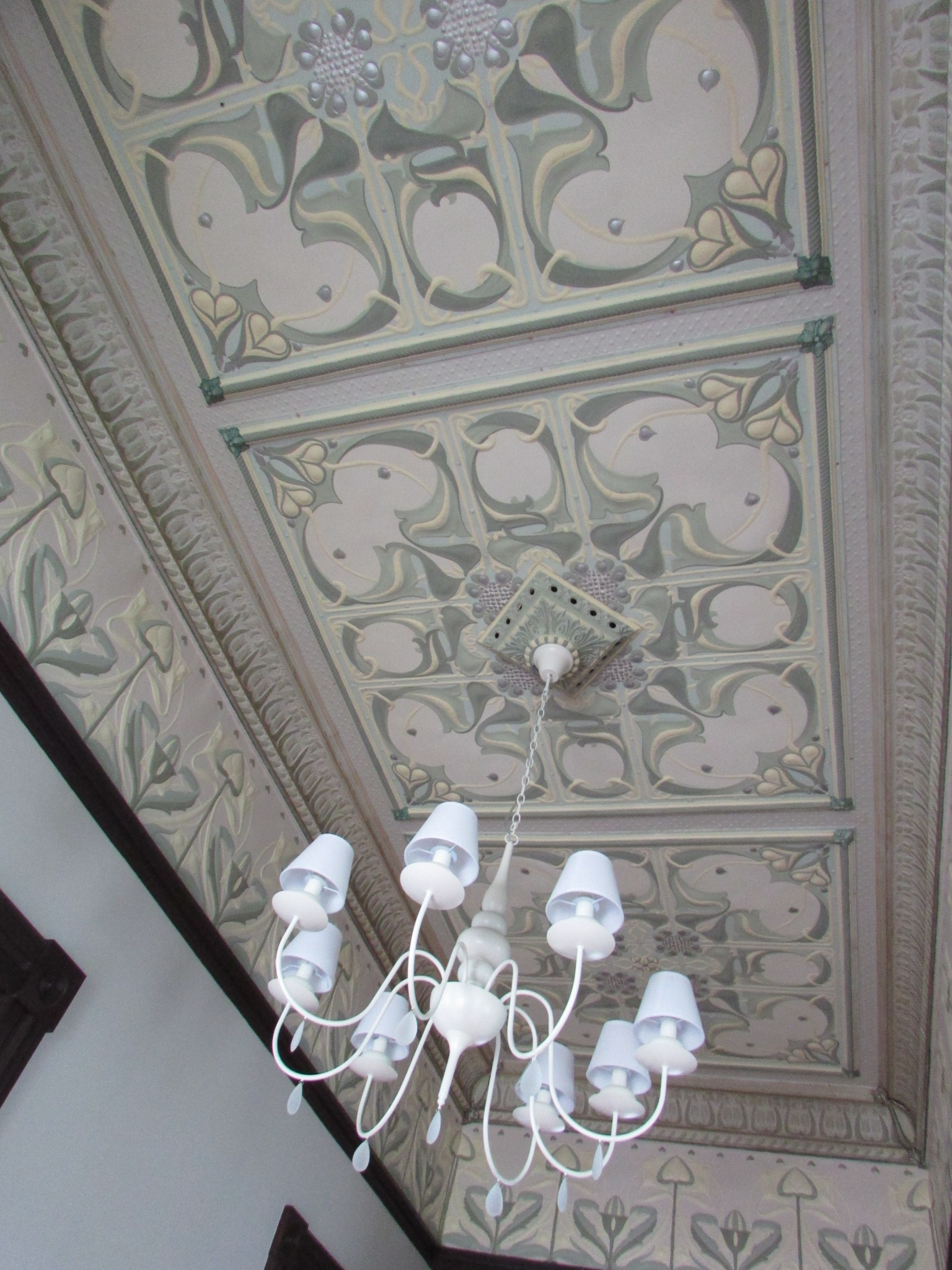
The fibreglass Art Nouveau design on the main hall ceiling

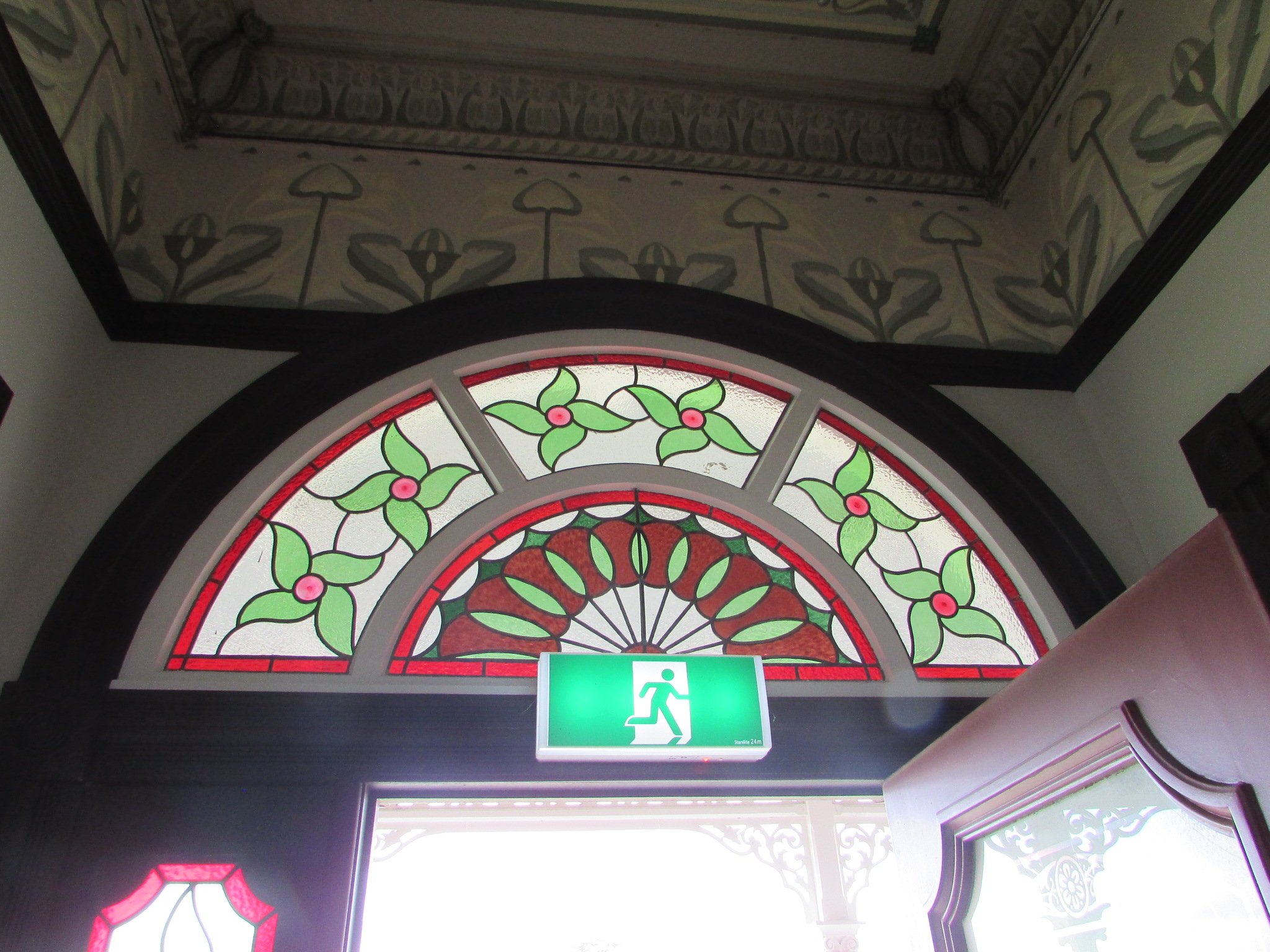
The stained glass fanlight above the front door

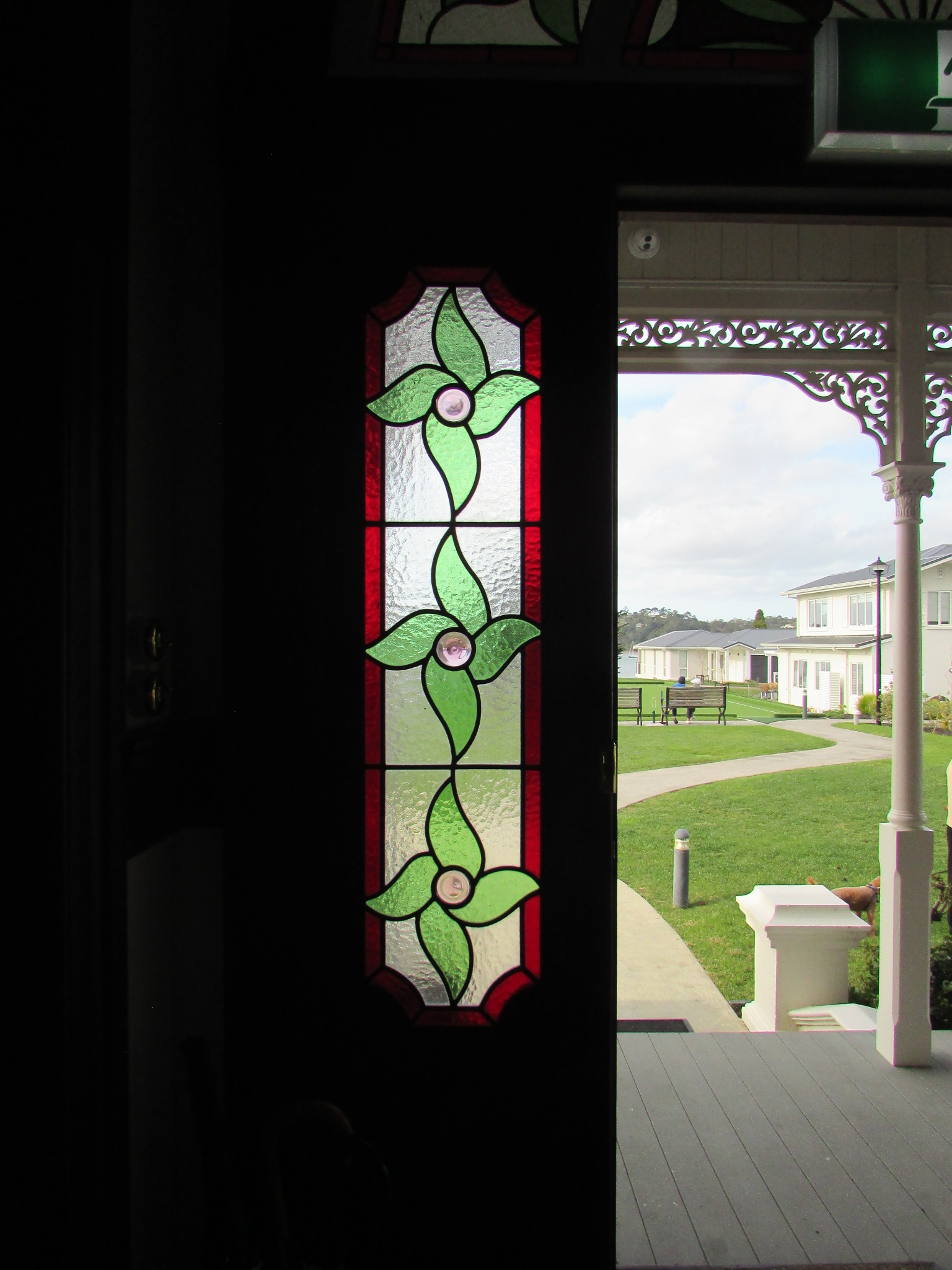
Stained glass window with verandah fretwork and Corinthian capital visible

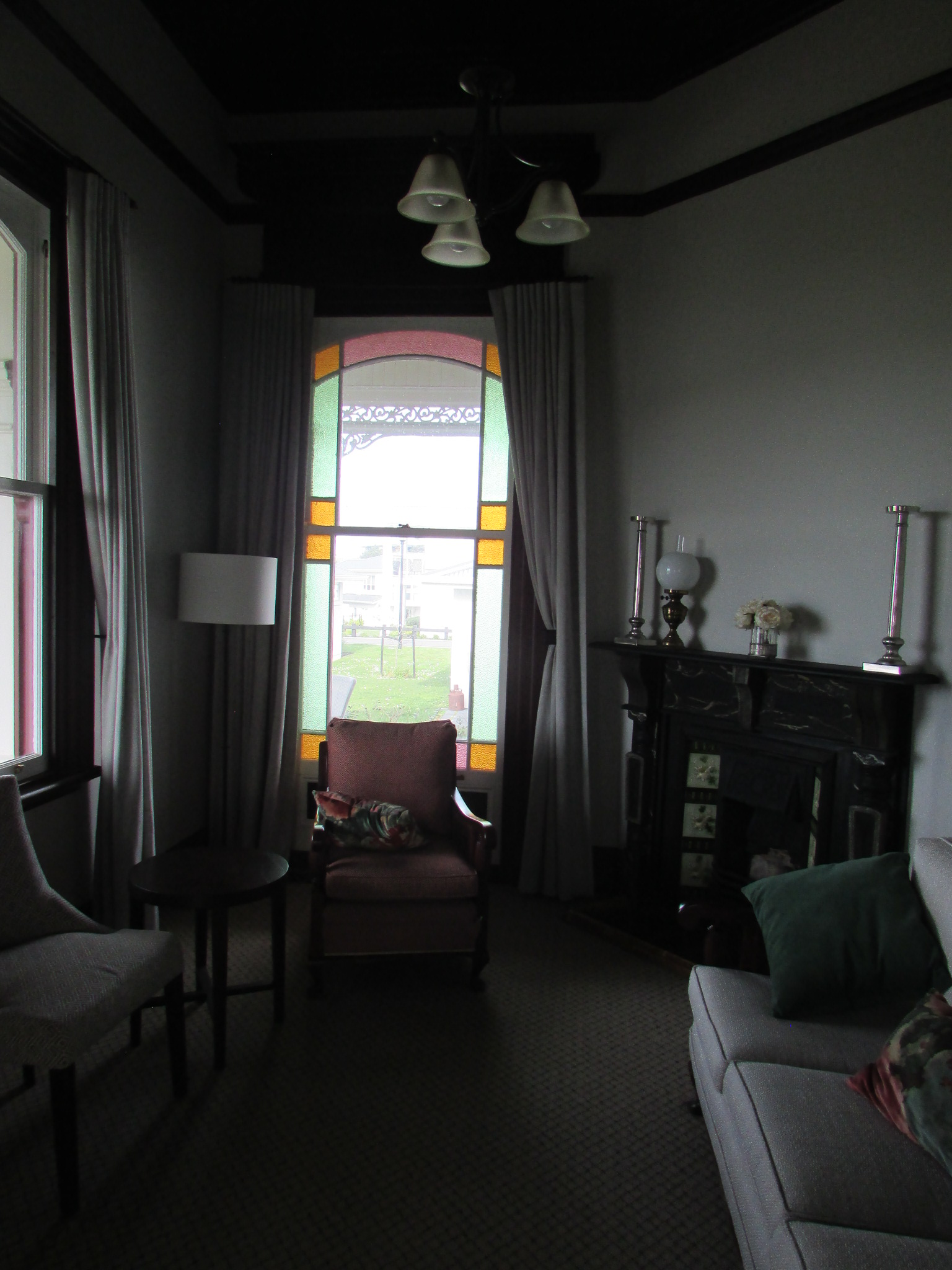
The small bedroom of Clark Cottage
