= Tom Clark (industrialist) =

New Zealand industrialist

Sir Thomas Edwin Clark (6 August 1916 – 14 June 2005) was a New Zealand industrialist who played a major role in a number of different enterprises. He was a patron of New Zealand's involvement in international yachting. He was the driving force in the development of Crown Lynn, a ceramics manufacturer begun by his great-grandfather Rice Owen Clark in the mid-1850s.

== Early life and family ==
Clark was born in Hobsonville on 6 August 1916. His father was also called Thomas Edwin Clark and his mother was Margaret Clark (née Morison). He attended King's College in Auckland but was pulled out of school in 1931 during the Great Depression, as the family could not afford the school fees, and was sent to work in the family's brick works instead at the age of 14.

Clark married three times and had nine children, including social campaigner Jackie Clark.

== Business career ==
In the late 1930s, Clark set up the original Crown Lynn factory and was involved in the process for almost 40 years.

During World War II, the country started running out of cups and saucers, as they were no longer imported and had never been manufactured locally at a grand scale. Clark Jr. started experimenting with mass production and built a tunnel kiln after reading as much about it as he could. Initially, he did not know how to attach handles successfully, and the Crown Lynn Potteries brand had a reputation into the 1950s for handles that broke off. By 1948, more than half of the company's production was sold to Australia, but when the Minister of Finance, Walter Nash, changed the exchange rate by 25%, that overseas market was "lost overnight". The company had a supply contract with the New Zealand Railways Department, and the railway cup and saucer are regarded as "one of the most famous Kiwi icons of the twentieth century". The name of Crown Lynn was changed to Ceramco in 1974, and the company diversified into areas like electronics and the wholesale of appliances. The lingerie company, Bendon, was purchased at that time. The pottery part of the business was shut down in 1989 due to cheap imports. Clark retired from Ceramco in 1993, after 62 years with the business.

== Personal life ==
Clark was a racing driver, owner and skipper of racing yachts, and a friend and mentor to the skipper Peter Blake.

== Honours ==
Clark was appointed a Knight Bachelor in the 1986 New Year Honours, for services to manufacturing, export, sport and the community. In 1997, he was inducted into the New Zealand Business Hall of Fame. In February 2005, Clark was presented the Key to the City from Bob Harvey, the mayor of Waitakere City.

== Death ==
Clark died on 14 June 2005. His funeral service was held at Holy Trinity Cathedral in Parnell, and he was cremated at Waikumete Crematorium. His third wife, Patricia, Lady Clark, died in 2026.
