= Hobsonville Point Secondary School =

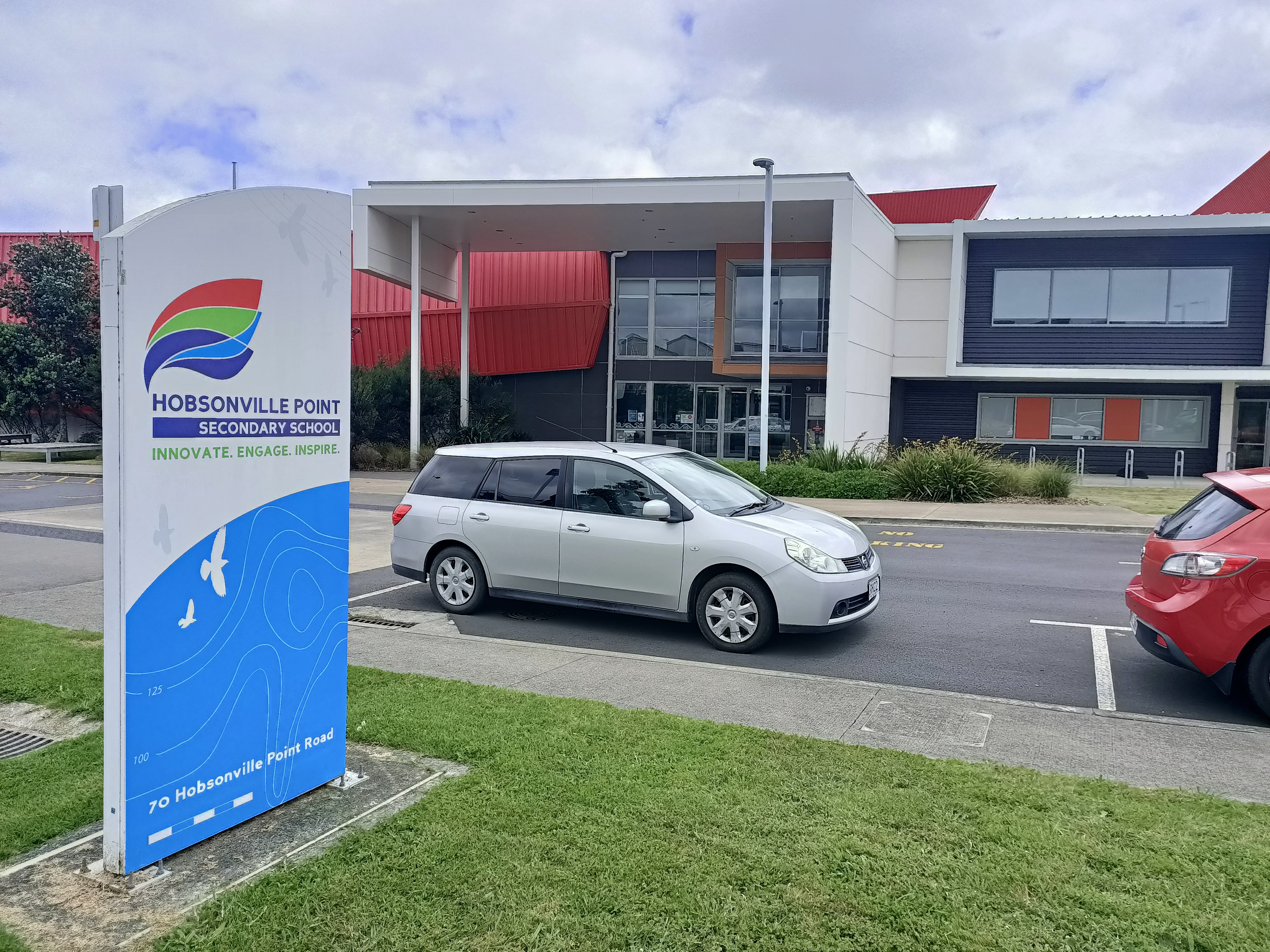

Location
- 70 Hobsonville Point Road; Hobsonville; Auckland 0618; New Zealand; 36.7949°S 174.6552°E

Information
- Funding type: State (public-private partnership)
- Opened: 4 February 2014
- Ministry of Education Institution no.: 6977
- Principal: Kirsty Dowding
- Years offered: 9–13
- Gender: Co-educational
- Enrolment: 1,056 (July 2026)
- Socio-economic decile: 10Z
- Website: www.hpss.school.nz

Hobsonville Point Secondary School is a state coeducational secondary school located in the Auckland, New Zealand suburb of Hobsonville. Opened in February 2014, it is the second school in New Zealand (and first secondary school) to be built under a public-private partnership, whereby the school buildings are constructed, maintained and managed separate from the school management by a private consortium. The school has a roll of 1,056 as of July 2026.

== History ==
The school was constructed as part of the Hobsonville Point housing development, serving the 3000 new homes being built on the former RNZAF Hobsonville Airbase and the wider Hobsonville/West Harbour area and easing roll capacity on existing nearby secondary schools. The school was planned to eventually take up to 1500 students.

The public-private partnership (PPP) for the school and the nearby Hobsonville Point Primary School (the first PPP school in New Zealand) was signed in April 2012, with the 25-year contract for the design, construction, maintenance, finance and management of the school buildings being let to the Learning Infrastructure Partners consortium of ASC Architects, Perumal Pedavoli Architects, Hawkins Construction, and Programmed Facility Management. At the end of the 25-year contract (i.e. in 2037), the school buildings will revert ownership to the Crown. It was estimated by the National Government that the partnership would save it $2 million over the 25-year contract. However, the partnership was criticised by the Labour Opposition in that it would cost taxpayers more than it would save, namely from the $3.5 million cost of developing the business plan and the $2.5 million cost of a "Relationships Manager" communicating between the schools' board of trustees and the private consortium over 25 years.

Construction of the school started in 2012. On 6 December 2012, a tornado hit the Hobsonville area and caused several large concrete panels at the school site to topple over onto a truck, killing three construction workers sheltering in the truck's cab. A memorial for the victims is located out the front of the school.

Hobsonville Point Secondary School opened for instruction for the first time on 3 February 2014, initially taking Year 9 students only. The new school buildings were not fully complete at the time, so the school was based at Hobsonville Point Primary School for the first four weeks. The school's opening roll was 125.

== Enrolment ==
As of July 2026, Hobsonville Point Secondary School has a roll of 1,056 students, of which 143 (13.5%) identify as Māori.

As of 2026, the school has an Equity Index of 430, placing it amongst schools whose students have below average socioeconomic barriers to achievement (roughly equivalent to deciles 6 and 7 under the former socio-economic decile system).
