= The Aunties =

New Zealand charitable organisation

- Founded: 2013
- Founder: Jackie Clark
- Type: Charity
- Purpose: Support for victims of domestic violence
- Headquarters: South Auckland, New Zealand
- Region served: New Zealand
- Key people: Jackie Clark
- Website: aunties.co.nz

The Aunties is a South-Auckland, New Zealand–based charity helping vulnerable women and children who have experienced domestic violence. Founded in 2013 by Jackie Clark, the group aims to provide material help and pastoral care in the spirit of manaakitanga.

The Aunties, through Clark's influence, emphasise charity donations being high quality rather than cast-offs, and should not include basic items like tinned tomatoes, considering that their charges should be gifted what they require and deserve, rather than be given a message that they should be grateful to receive second-hand cast-offs when under stress and in need.

The group in 2018 had a network of around fifty people helping organise the group's activities. It has since inspired similar organisations in Wellington and Christchurch.

Clark received the Queen Service Medal and the Supreme Award at the Women of Influence Awards for her work in creating and operating The Aunties.
