= Hobsonville Church =

Church building in Auckland, New Zealand

Hobsonville Church & Settlers' Cemetery
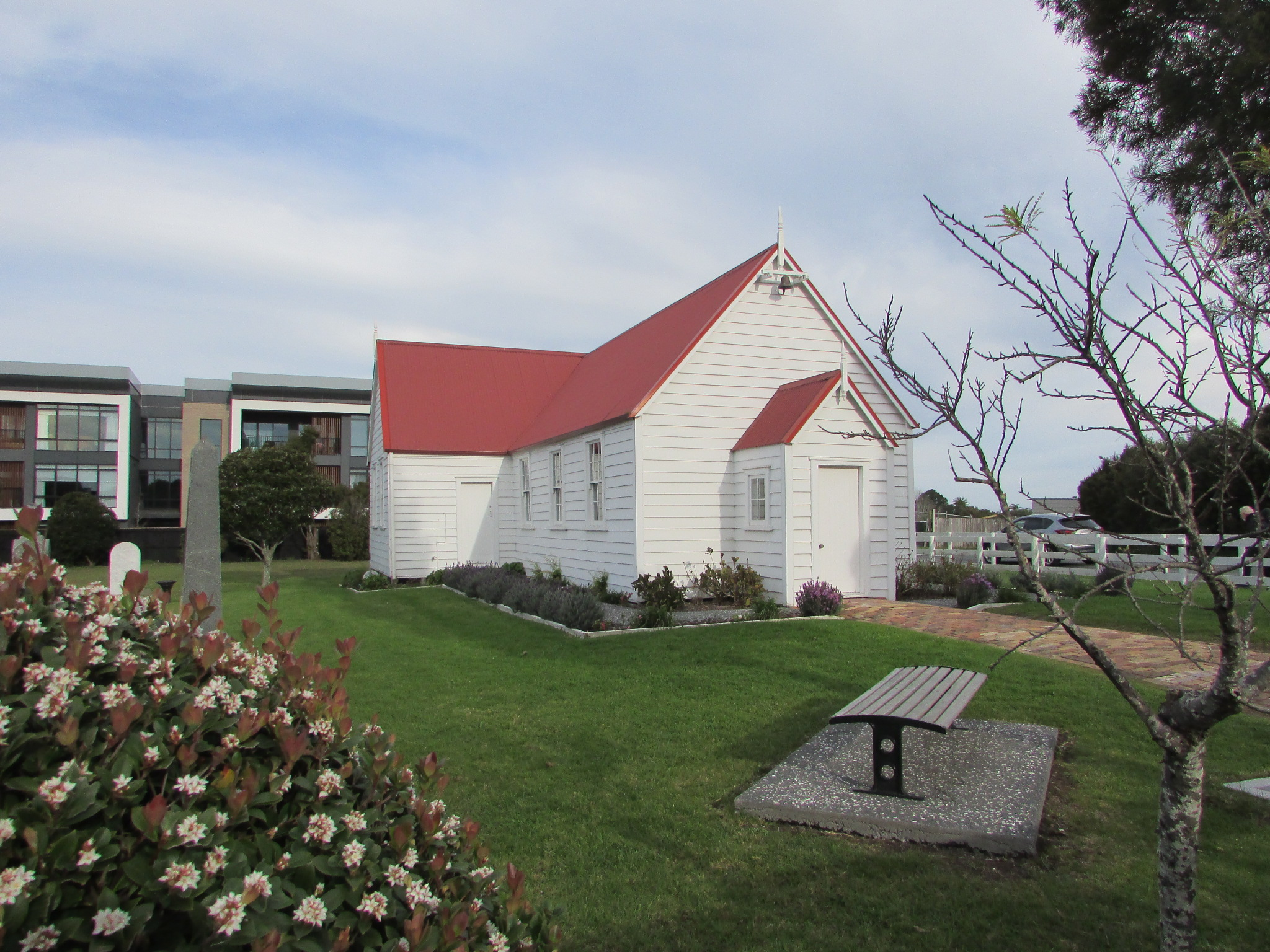
- Hobsonville Church with cemetery located to left

General information
- Architectural style: Vernacular
- Location: 1 Scott Road and Clark Road, Hobsonville, Hobsonville
- Coordinates: 36°48′00″S 174°39′19″E
- Year built: 1875–1876
- Owner: The Hobsonville Church and Settlers' Cemetery Preservation Society Incorporated
- Affiliation: Presbyterian (formerly)

Technical details
- Floor area: 30 ft × 18 ft (9.1 m × 5.5 m)
- Grounds: 1 acre (4,000 m^{2})

Design and construction
- Main contractor: John Danby

Website
- www.hobsonvillechurch.co.nz

Heritage New Zealand – Category 2
- Designated: 7 July 2019
- Reference no.: 9796

The Hobsonville Church & Settlers' Cemetery is a historic church building and cemetery located in Hobsonville, Auckland, New Zealand, and listed as a Category II building by Heritage New Zealand.

The church and cemetery were constructed by the original Hobsonville settlers in 1875. Many of the early settlers and their families are interred at the cemetery.

== Description ==
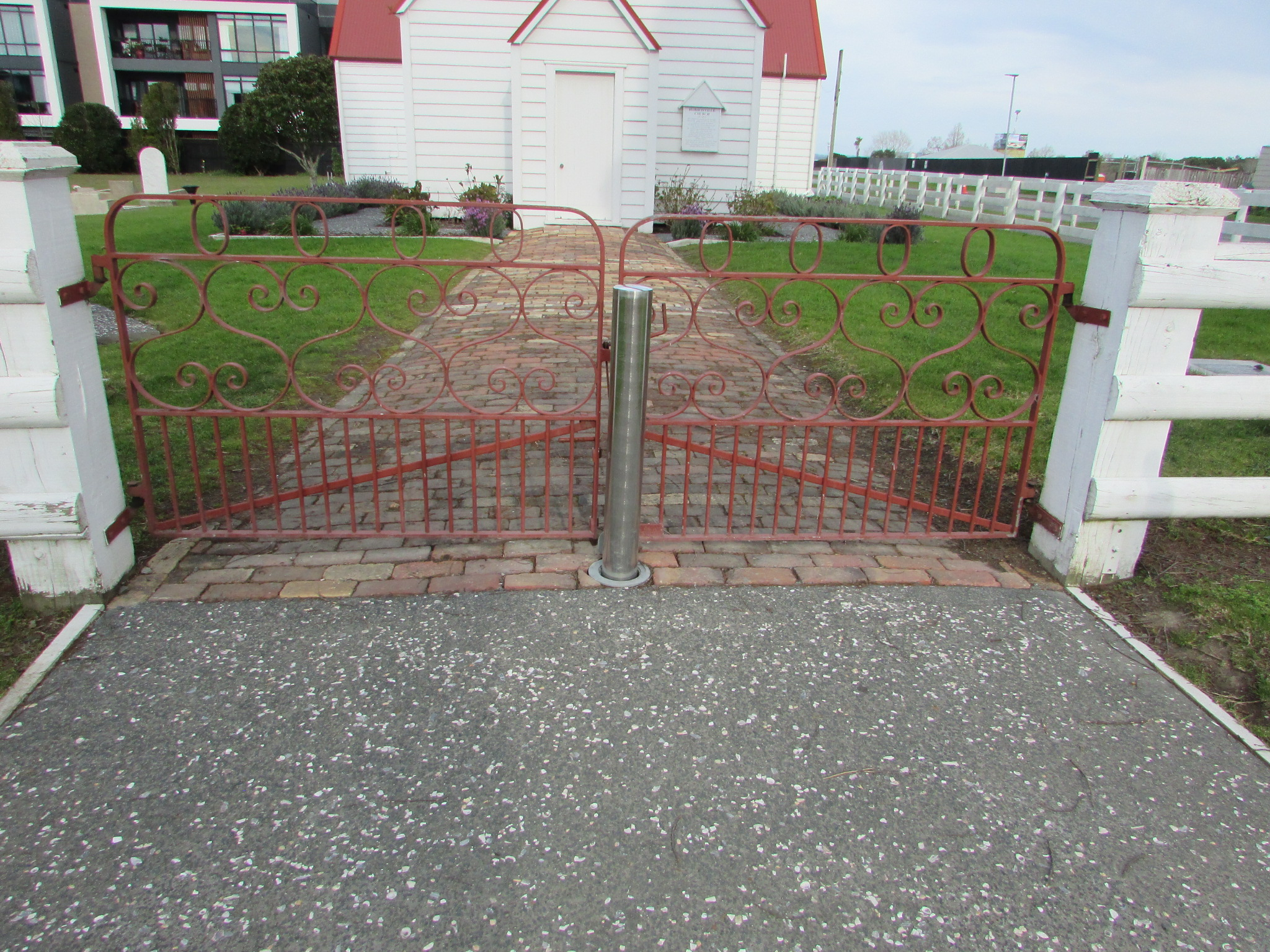
The wrought iron gate was taken from the old Hobsonville School before it was demolished

The property features a cemetery with a small Gothic-influenced verncular wooden church. The church has a gable roof. The windows are double-hung sashes and the flooring has tongue and groove boards. Inside the nave are two plaques commemorating the settlers who built the church and the first five trustees, the former was installed for the diamond jubilee.

The church initially featured a porch, but this was later turned into an entryway sometime between the early 1900s and 1963.

Several of the graves incorporate ceramics and pottery into the design of tombs and headstones. Some plots feature ceramic markets instead of traditional stone or wood, some plots are constructed from ceramic bricks, and a cremation wall uses ceramic pipes. These practices are unique to the area. Many of those interred at the cemetery are the original settlers and their descents. Notably, Rice Owen Clark, Joshua Carder, and Joshua Ockleston are all buried there.

Many children are buried in the cemetery, with some of their graves being unmarked, likely due to high infant mortality in the late 19th century in New Zealand.

The entrance to the property is paved with ceramic bricks and features a wrought iron gate that was taken from the old Hobsonville School before its demolition.

== History ==
The growth of the settlement of Hobsonville created a need for a dedicated facility for burials, church services, and education. Previously education and church services were held in private homes. In 1875 Rice Owen Clark donated an acre of land to serve as a cemetery and a combined church and school. The building was completed in early 1876 by John Danby.

Robert Sommerville hosted the Presbyterian services at the church before later becoming Moderator of the General Assembly.

Following the passing of Education Act 1877, the land was transferred to a group of trustees—Joshua Carder, Rice Owen Clark II, Joshua Ockleston, Thomas Scott, and William Sinton. These trustees were the original settlers or their descendants. The building also saw use as a library, polling station, and meeting room for the Hobsonville Band of Hope, a local group involved in the temperance movement.

Barbara McLeod was elected to the school committee in 1881, one of the first women to be elected to a school committee in the wider Auckland area. The school operated on a half-time basis because the teacher was also working at Kumeu. This continued until 1885, when the Kumeu school closed.

In 1895 the education board obtained land and opened a new school building at what is now Hobsonville School. After the school was relocated, the church was enlarged and had transepts added for use as a Presbyterian church. Church services continued to run until 1965.

A memorial tablet in honour of the soldiers who had served in World War I from Hobsonville and neighbouring Massey, Waimarie, and Brigham's Creek was unveiled at the church in 1921 by Christopher James Parr, the minister for education and MP for the area.

Following the establishment of RNZAF Base Hobsonville nearby, the church began serving servicemen and their families.

In 1940 the Hobsonville Church merged with St Andrews in Henderson, and the Presbyterian Trust became owners of the property. Following the complete closure of the church in 1967, the building came to be used for air scouts before falling into disuse.

The Hobsonville Church and Settlers' Cemetery Preservation Society was established in 1995; shortly thereafter restoration work began. The society continues to maintain the church and cemetery. Alongside the restoration work two white pines were planted at the entrance as a commemoration. In 1998 the property was transferred to the Hobsonville Church and Settlers' Cemetery Preservation Society, which is composed of descendants of the original settlers. The completion of the refurbishment in 2000 coincided with the 125th anniversary of the building. Sir Tom Clark, great-grandson of Rice Owen Clark, was a notable supporter of the project and attended the anniversary.

The last burial took place in 2007, with the cemetery still allowing ashes to be laid to rest.
