= Waipareira block =

Land sold by Ngāti Whātua to The Crown in 1853

The Waipareira block is a 600-acre (240 ha) block of land in the West Auckland area of New Zealand sold by Māori iwi Ngāti Whātua to the Crown in 1853. The Waipareira block includes all of Hobsonville and the Whenuapai peninsula.

== Etymology ==
The name Waipareira refers to a stream in the area that flows out to the Waitemata Harbour. Waipareira means 'the creek at the place before mentioned'.

== History ==
The area of the Waipareira block was inhabited by Māori long before European settlement of New Zealand. Although archaeological evidence of habitation such as middens has been discovered, no evidence of permanent settlements has been found in the area. The poor soil quality around the Wallace and Waiarohia inlets prevented permanent settlement until after European farming techniques were able to improve the soil quality.

In 1853, the Crown purchased 600 acres from Ngāti Whātua for £50. The sale proved controversial and was later renegotiated.

The Waipareira Road District was established in 1867 and began operation 5 October 1868. By 1883 it was not listed but it was restored in 1884 before being dissolved in 1886.
