= Rice Owen Clark =

English settler in New Zealand

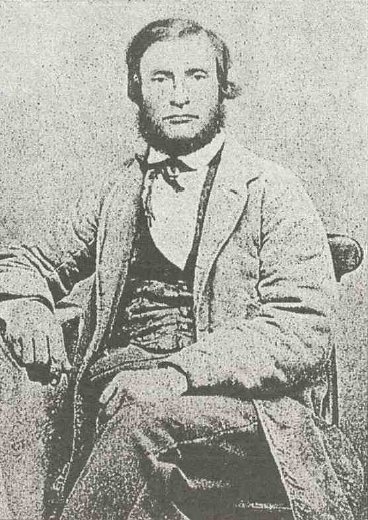
- Rice Owen Clark (1862)
- Born: 1816; Great Marlow, Buckinghamshire, England
- Died: 16 June 1886 (aged 69–70); Hobsonville, Waitemata County, New Zealand
- Occupation: Businessman
- Spouse: Louisa Felgate

Rice Owen Clark (1816 – 16 June 1896) was an English settler in New Zealand, establishing a brickworks at Hobsonville that was the origin of Crown Lynn and Ceramco.

== Biography ==
Clark was baptised in Great Marlow, Buckinghamshire, England, on 19 September 1816, the son of Josiah and Ann Clark and the brother of engineers Edwin Clark and Josiah Latimer Clark. Clark worked as an underwriter for Lloyd's. He emigrated to New Zealand on the Gertrude, arriving at Port Nicholson on 31 October 1841. Clark may have emigrated to escape a marriage, leading to him being charged with bigamy by the Supreme Court. Clark was found not guilty of the charge. Clark worked as a sawyer, Māori interpreter, land surveyor before eventually running a church school in Wellington, after it was destroyed by an earthquake in 1848 he moved to Auckland. After moving to Auckland Clark initially worked as a clerk.

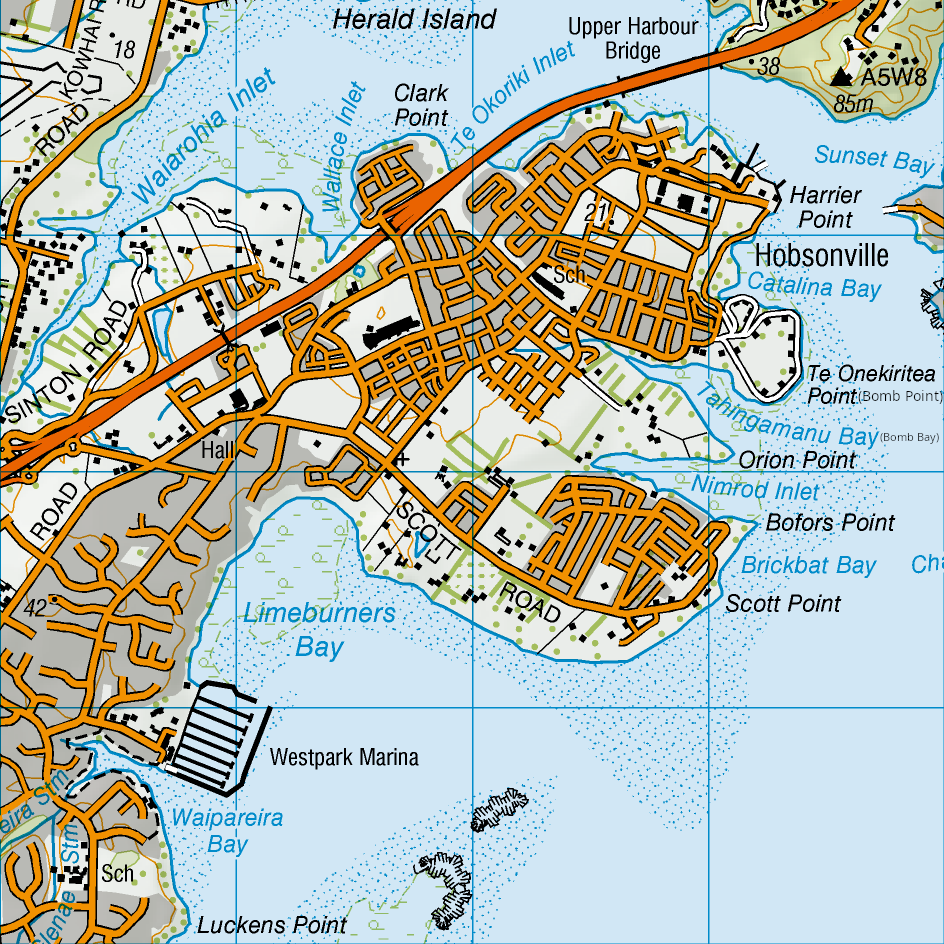
Topographic map of Hobsonville. Clark established his pottery works at Limeburners Bay.

In 1854 Clark bought land in Hobsonville, becoming one of the first European settlers in the area. Originally he try his hand at farming, but finding the land needing heavy drainage, he made his own field tiles to help, using clay, tree branches and a hot fire; the resulting tiles facilitated the effective draining of his fields. Seeing his success, neighbouring farmers began asking him if he would make field tiles for their property's, and thus Clark's affiliation with clay work began and soon after outshone his farming prospects. It was there that he set up a prosperous business making drain pipes, bricks and tiles for the increasing number of settlers. Much of the clay he used was being sourced from Limeburners Bay, which is now an archaeological site. In the 1860s he was importing equipment from England to keep up with demand. In 1876 his son, Rice Owen Clark II, joined the business. By the 1880s the business had an office on Customs Street and its own barge for transporting goods.

Clark died at his home in Hobsonville on 16 June 1896, and was buried at Hobsonville Cemetery.

== Legacy ==
In 1908 Clark's Potteries became R.O. Clark Limited. His great-grandson, Tom Clark, inherited the business setting up a ceramics company which eventually became known as Crown Lynn Potteries Ltd.
