= Hobsonville =

- Suburb
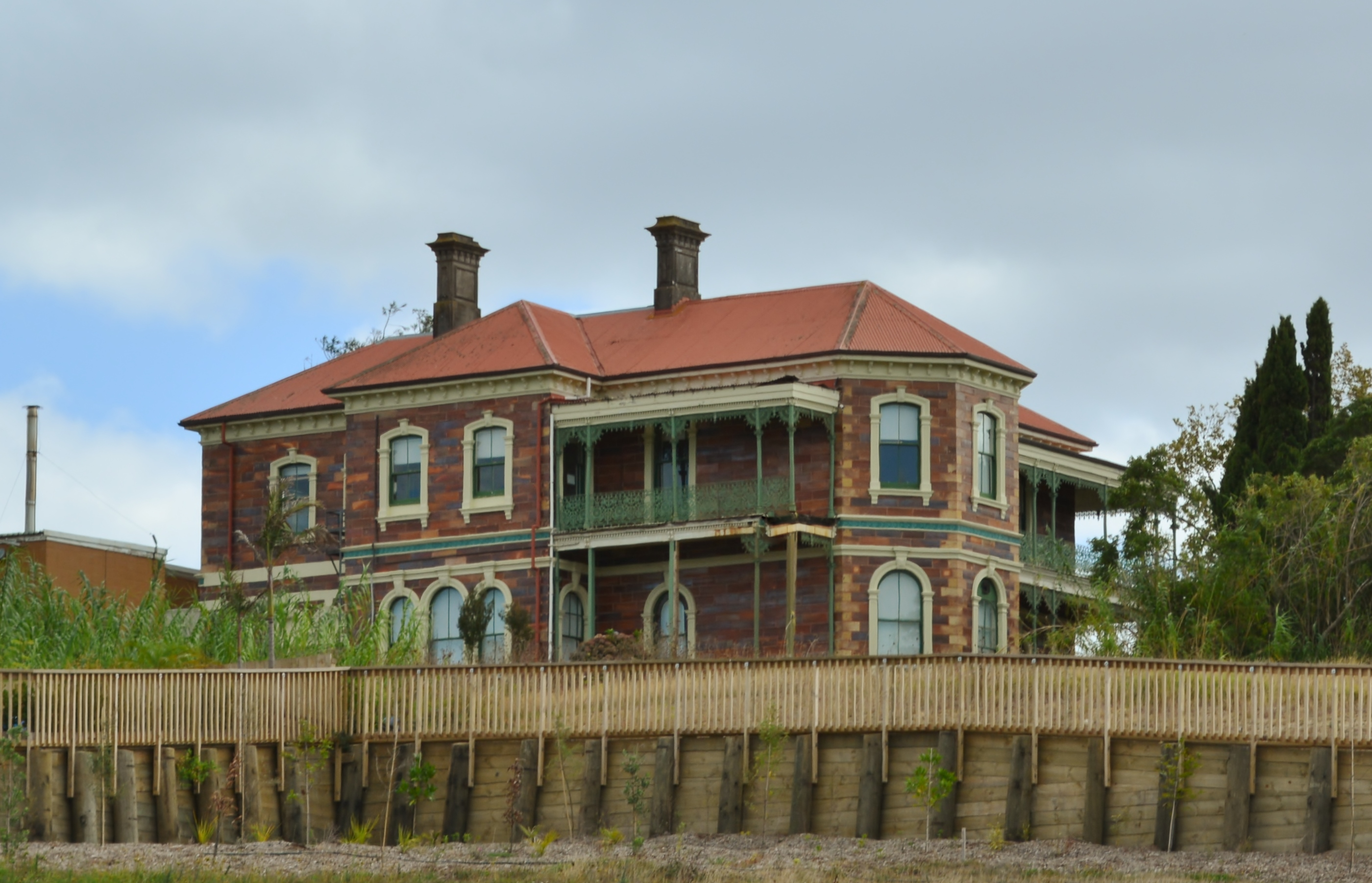
- Clark House has strong ties to Hobsonville through its use in the pottery industry and as an Air Force building

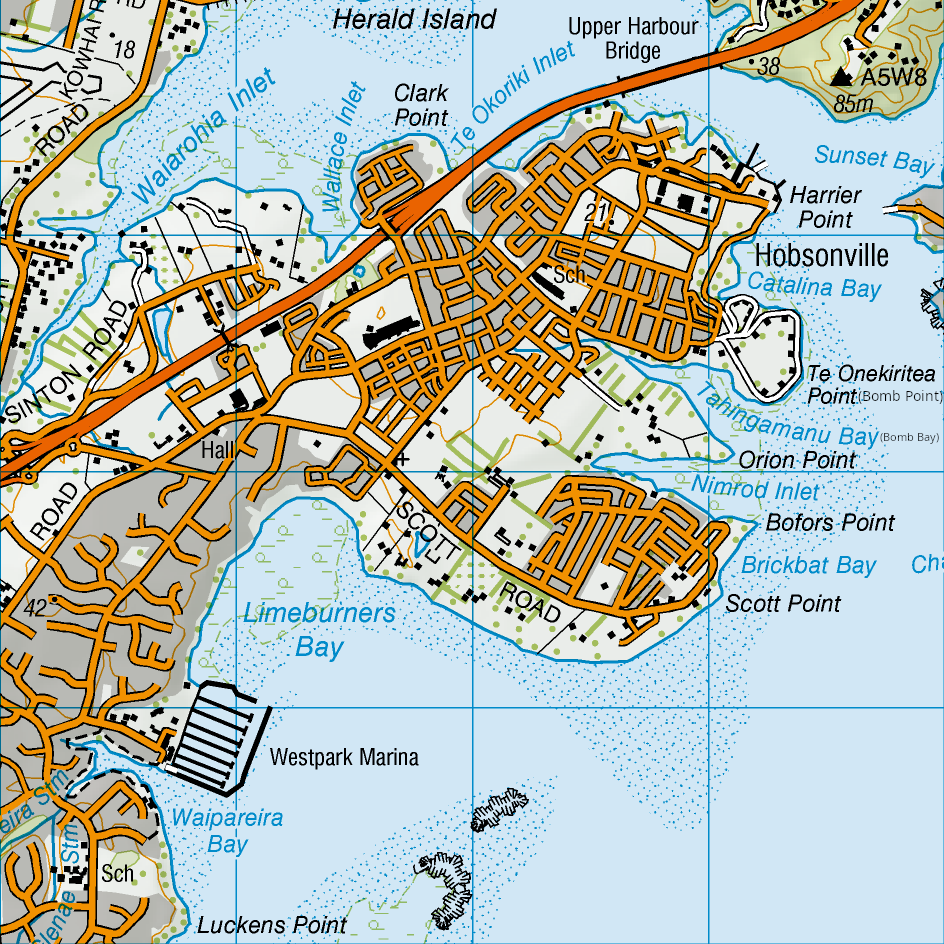
- Coordinates: 36.791450°S 174.662447°E
- Country: New Zealand
- City: Auckland
- Local authority: Auckland Council
- Electoral ward: Albany ward
- Local board: Upper Harbour Local Board

Area
  - Land: 642 ha (1,590 acres)

Population (June 2025)
  - Total: 17,200
  - Density: 2,680/km^{2} (6,940/sq mi)
- Ferry terminals: Hobsonville Point, Westpark

Whenuapai	Herald Island	Greenhithe
West Harbour	Hobsonville	Beach Haven
	Waitematā Harbour

Hobsonville is a suburb in West Auckland, in the North Island of New Zealand. Historically a rural settlement, Hobsonville has now developed into a suburb of Auckland.

Hobsonville was one of the earliest European settlements in the area and became a large part of the early pottery industry in New Zealand. Hobsonville later served as a Royal New Zealand Air Force base from 1929 to 2001. Following the closure of the air base a plan for a large scale residential development was undertaken by the Housing Ministry.

Hobsonville is bounded by Whenuapai to the northwest, West Harbour to the west, with the rest of the area bounded by the Waitematā Harbour. The Upper Harbour Bridge connects Hobsonville with Greenhithe.

== Geography ==
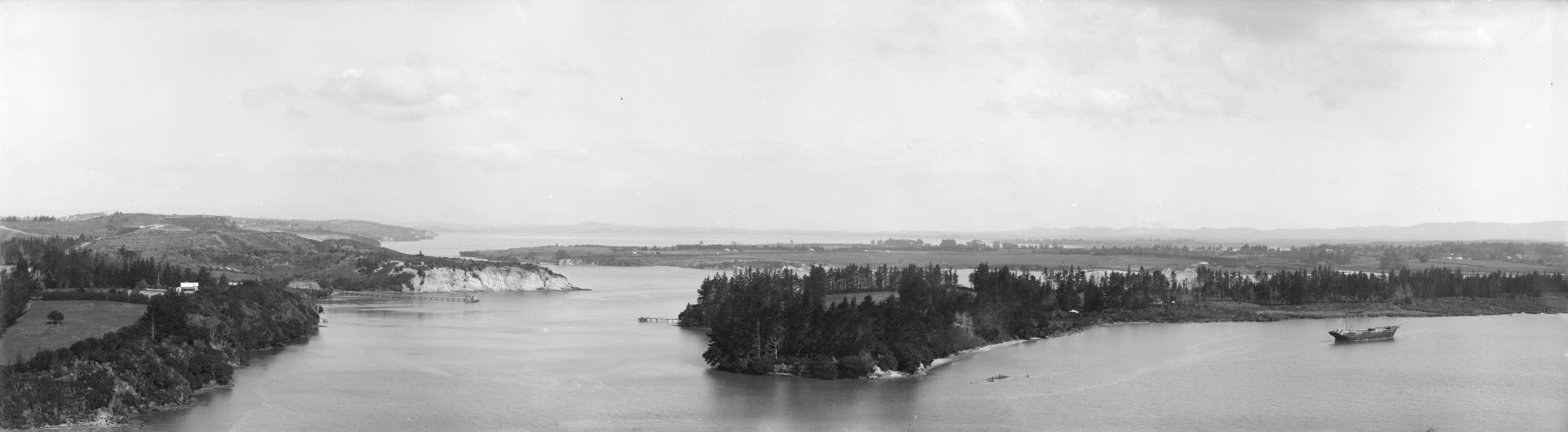
Photo from 1912 showing Greenhithe (left), Herald Island (front right), and Hobsonville (back right)

The boundaries of Hobsonville with the neighbouring Whenuapai and West Harbour are not defined. Early maps of the area show Hobsonville to cover the entire peninsula. The Hobsonville peninsula rises to less than 30 m (98 ft) above sea level. Most of the soil is allophanic. Felton Mathew described Hobsonville in June 1840 as:

of the most sterile and desolate description, being composed of a sour red and white clay – the fern is dwarfish and thinly scattered, the surface chiefly covered in rushes, varied by an occasional patch of stunted scrub

== History ==
=== Pre-European ===
Archaeological evidence points to periodic and seasonal occupation of the peninsula by Maori between the 17th and early 19th century. No evidence exists to suggest any permanent settlement of the Hobsonville area. Maori archaeological sites are exclusively located around the coastline, reflecting the importance of the Upper Waitemata Harbour in providing seafood. The poor soil quality around the Wallace and Waiarohia inlets prevented permanent settlement until after European farming techniques were able to improve the soil quality.

=== Settlement and pottery works ===
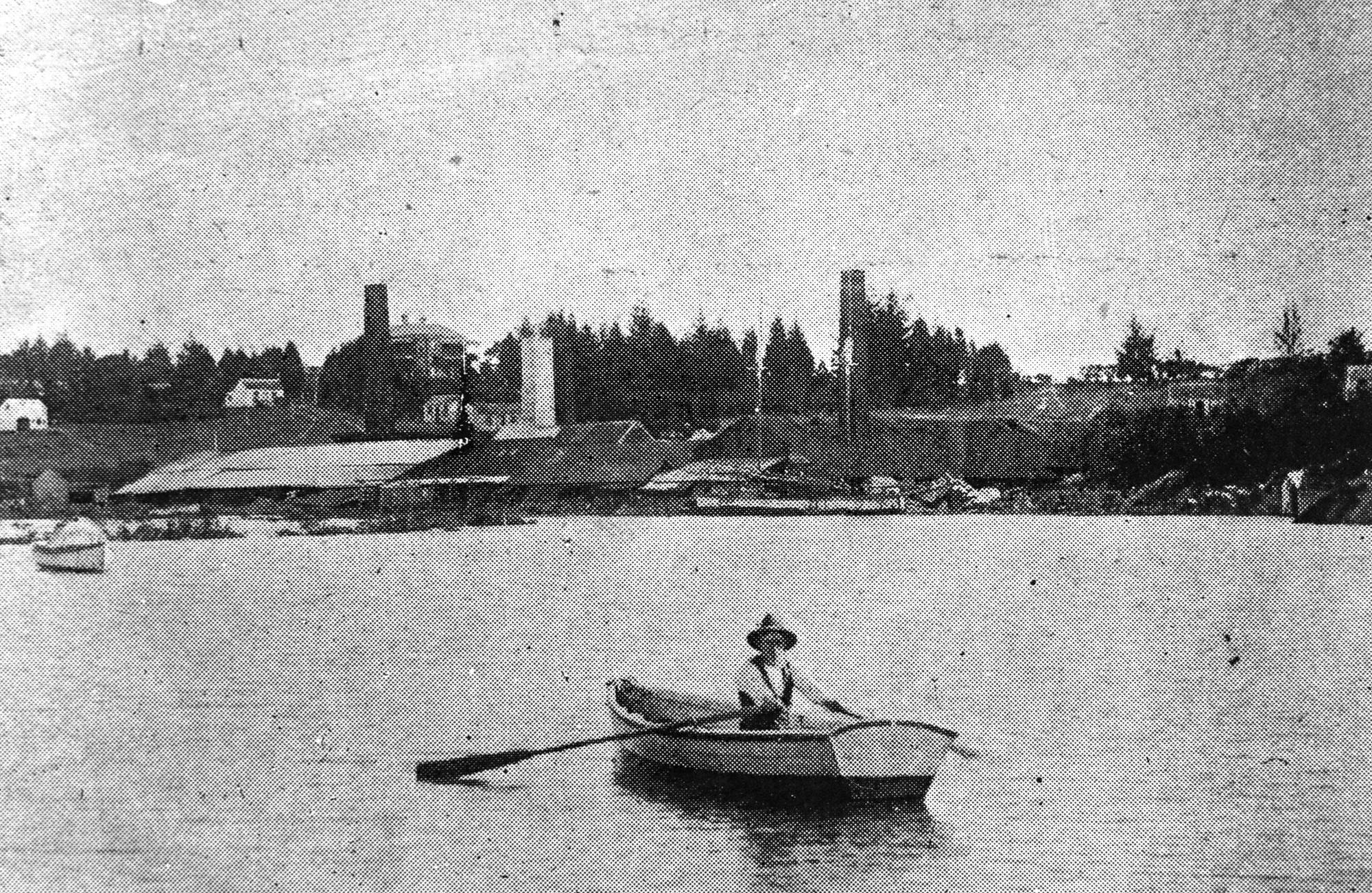
Limeburners Bay pottery works in 1905. Clark House can be seen in background

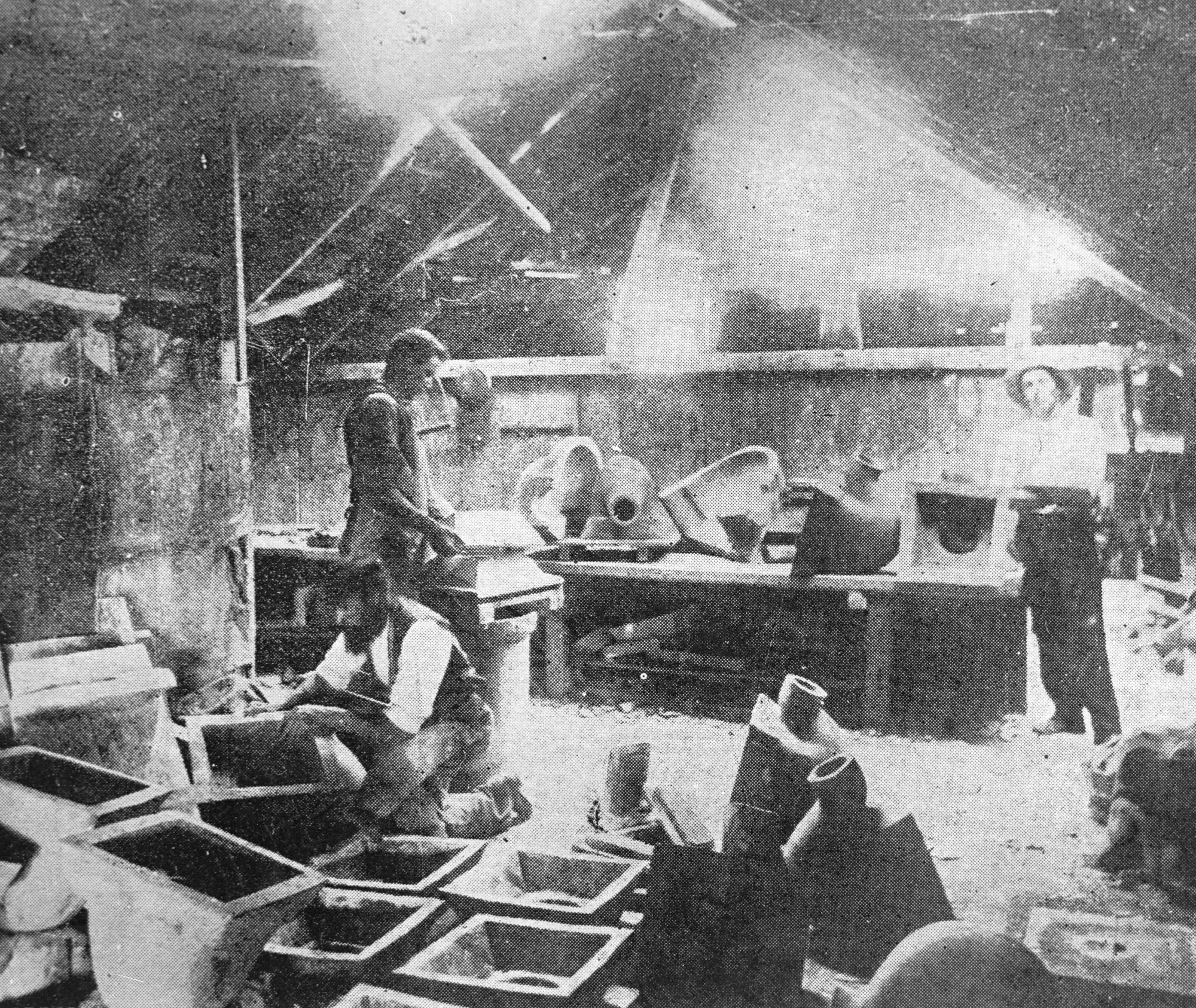
Pottery moulders working at Clark's pottery works

Hobsonville was named after the first Governor of New Zealand, William Hobson. After landing by sea at the site in June 1840, Hobson thought it suitable as the seat of Government for New Zealand but later rejected this on the advice of the Surveyor-General of New Zealand, Felton Mathew. Hobsonville was acquired by The Crown in 1853 as part of the Waipareira block. An 1854 hydrographical chart refers to it as being fern land. In 1886 Hobsonville had a post office open. In 1908 it was large enough to become a town district within Waitemata County (Note: New Lynn was the only other settlement in western Waitemata County large enough to become a town district at the time) and in the following year it became a town district, but by 1913 it had been dissolved.

The first European settler of the area, Rice Owen Clark, bought land in 1854. As the ground was too moist for farming due to the poor permeability of the soil, Clark developed tiles from the clay to drain his property to enable farming. Other settlers paid Clark to make tiles for their properties and Clark moved from agriculture to pottery as this was more lucrative, later establishing a large pottery work at Limeburner's Bay. In 1867 there were two pottery works in Hobsonville. Steam power was first used at the Carder brothers' Waitemata Pottery at Scott Point. Under Clark's son, Rice Owen Clark II, the pottery works would expand and become the largest in the southern hemisphere through foreshore reclamation and introduction of steam power. Attempts to expand the market for ceramics resulted in the construction of Clark House, which was constructed with hollow ceramic blocks. Several other buildings were built with this method—mostly in Hobsonville—but it never became widely adopted and was eventually abandoned. (Note: The known buildings to use the method are the Warkworth Town Hall, Rodney County Council offices (demolished), the engineers/3 bedroom house, Clark Cottage, an unknown worker's building at Sinton Road (demolished), two outbuildings at Clarks Lane (demolished), Wood's Place (demolished), a butcher shop on Clark Road (demolished) a residential property in Whenuapai and a commercial property in Morningside.) Another attempt resulted in one of the earliest buildings to use concrete in the Auckland region: a duplex constructed from lime concrete that used pottery and clinker as an aggregate. (Note: The construction of the building precedes the development of Portland cement concrete.) The church cemetery also contains graves constructed with ceramics.

By 1885 Clark's ceramic works produced 60,000 bricks a week and by the 20th century Clark's business was the largest producer of pottery and ceramics in the Auckland area.

Other pottery works in the area include: Joshua Carder's, Carder was a potter from Staffordshire and set up works in late 1863; Robert Holland's, Holland set up at Limeburners Bay in c.1904 but was bought out by Clark 5 years later; and Ockleston's in 1903 at the Waiarohia inlet, Ockleston's was bought around the same time as Holland's by Clark and was the only pottery works not located around the southern part of the Hobsonville peninsula; some goods at Hobsonville were shipped as far as Napier, Thames, and Waipukerau district.

Much of the land however was not built upon during this time. In 1929 the clayworks closed, as the cost of transporting the dwindling clay resources from the area became too high. During the Great Depression, the West Auckland clay industries amalgamated, and were centralised at New Lynn. These pottery works formed the Amalgamated Brick and Pipe Company that later became Ceramco.

Remnants of the pottery works such as old broken pieces of pottery still exist along the shore around Limeburners Bay. The influence of the industry is also evident through local feature names such as Limeburners and Brickbat Bays and Pottery Creek.

=== RNZAF ===
Henry Clark sold 167 acres (68 ha) of land in Hobsonville to the New Zealand Permanent Air Force in November 1925. The land sold was farmland and featured a few buildings. By 1929 the base had an office, control hut, boat shed, hangar, jetty and slipway, and several houses for airmen. The Hobsonville airbase also had a pigeon loft as they used carrier pigeons in the aircraft before obtaining wireless equipment later.

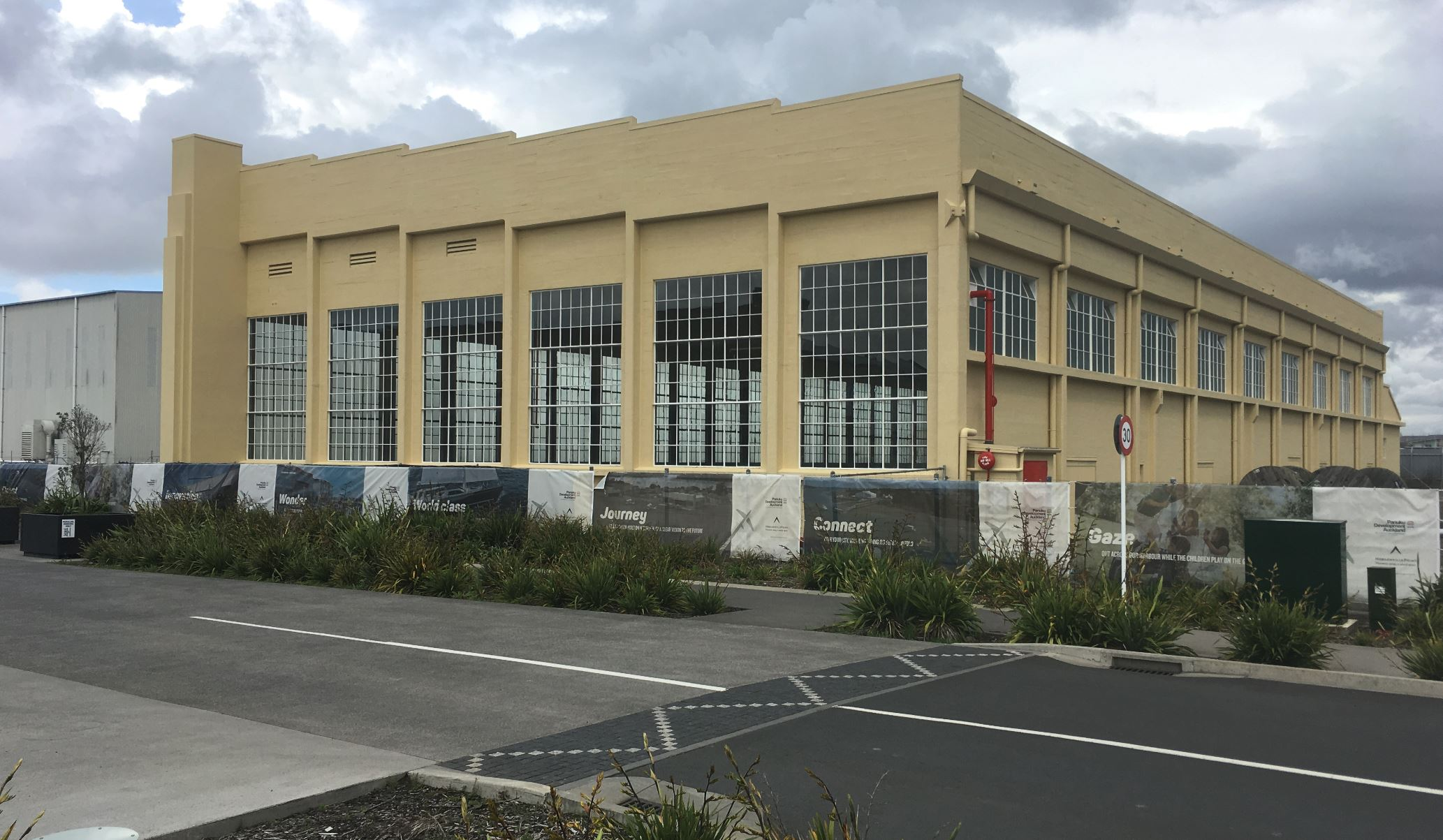
1 Technical Training School's hangar, Hobsonville

Hobsonville still has many historical buildings from the 1920s and 1930s relating to the airfield, including officers' residences, barracks, and hangars which were used to house seaplanes and helicopters. In 1937 the New Zealand Permanent Air Force became the Royal New Zealand Air Force. The Cochrane Report led to Hobsonville becoming a seaplane station, with Whenuapai and Ohakea taking non-seaplanes. Munitions were stored at Bomb Bay, becoming the area now known as Bomb Point. (Note: Officially Te Onikiritea Point)

From September 1938 a register of potential tradesmen and groundstaff for any necessary expansion of the RNZAF was begun. "The Munich crisis made it appear that war might break out at any time, and the scheme was put into effect immediately.. [t]he expansion of the RNZAF immediately before the war was so rapid that the Technical Training School at Hobsonville could not train sufficient fitters and riggers for the service." This led to population growth at the Hobsonville base and necessitated the development of new housing and facilities.

During the Second World War Hobsonville served as a base for testing aircraft before deployment else where in the Pacific. Following the war Hobsonville was used for technical training by the RNZAF. Seaplanes declined following the Second World War and the last seaplane flight at Hobsonville took place in 1967. The station was administratively joined with the airfield at Whenuapai in 1965 to become RNZAF Base Auckland. Since 2001 the operations based in Hobsonville began to be relocated to other bases and defence force land was marked as surplus and gradually sold off.

=== Redevelopment ===
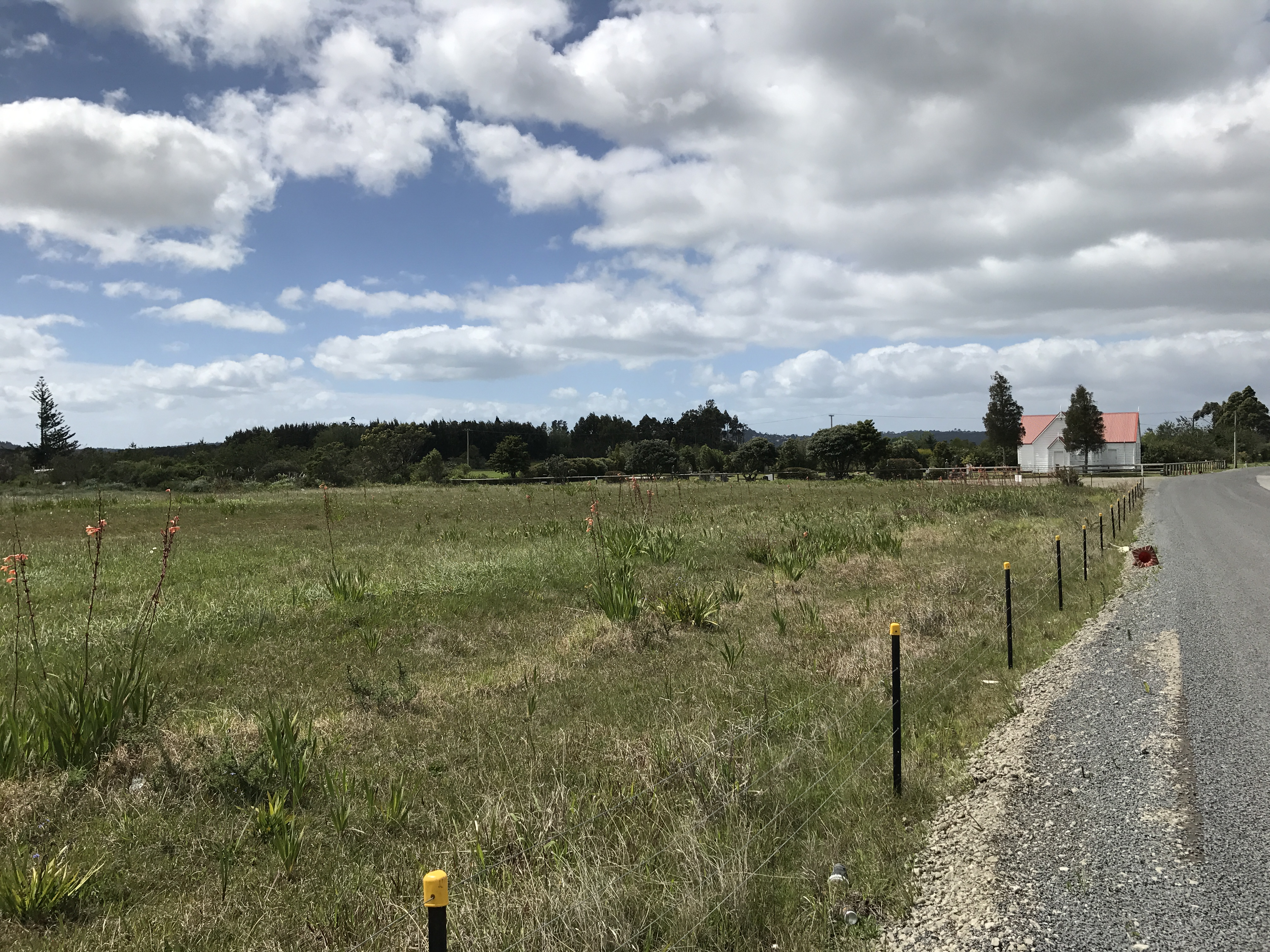
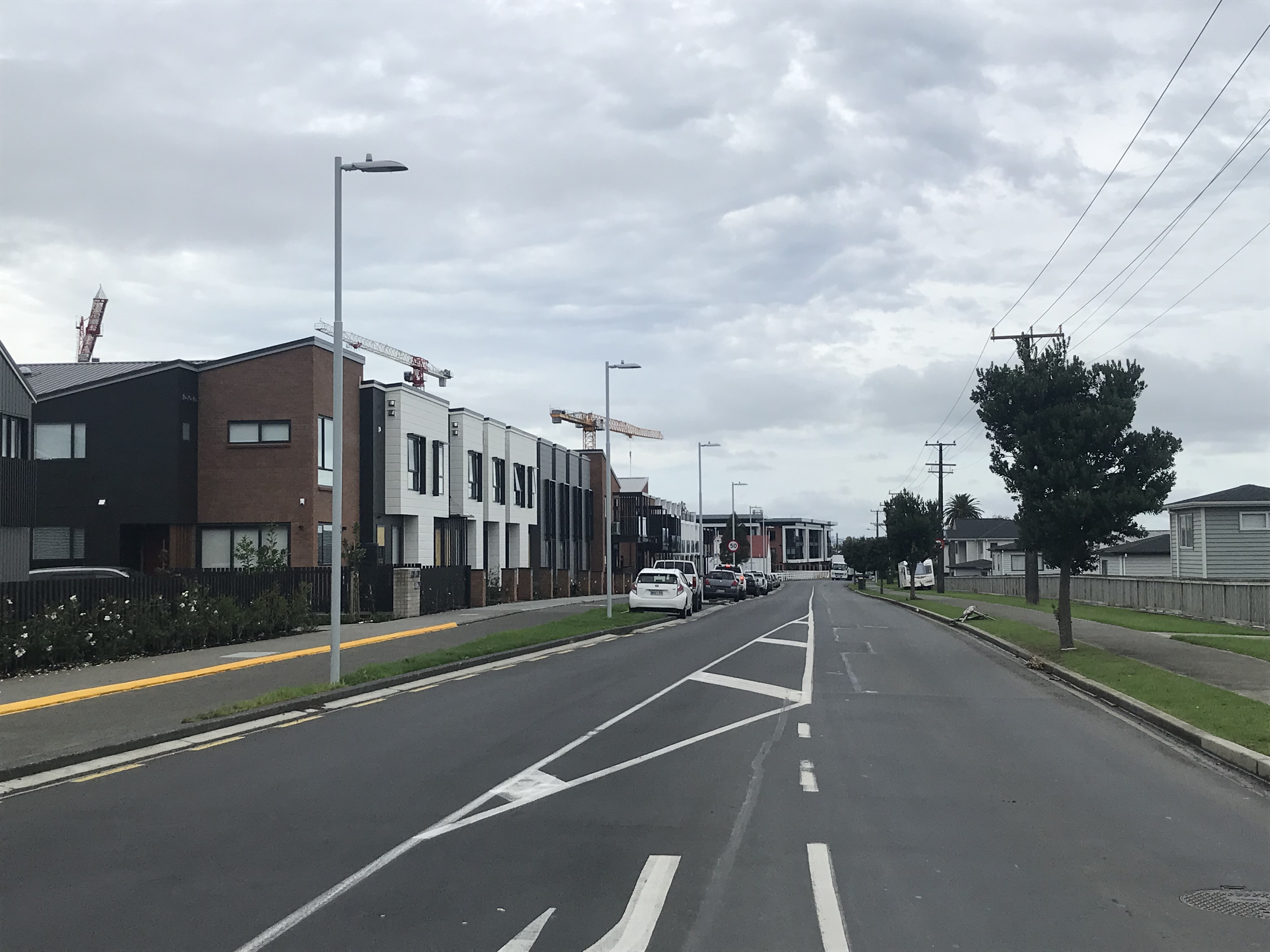
Photo taken on Clark Road showing the difference between October 2017 (left) and May 2022 (right) with the Hobsonville Church barely visible in the right photo

Hobsonville was still rural throughout most of the 20th century. Towards the end of the century and into the early 21st century, Hobsonville became increasingly urbanised. Dense housing estates have been developed in recent years but there are still some rural sections left. The start of this growth occurred in 2002, with the sale of the Hobsonville Airfield to Housing New Zealand. Housing New Zealand initially planned to develop the area to have 3,000 homes. This number increased to 4,500 by 2019. The development is known as Hobsonville Point. Led by the Hobsonville Land Company (HLC) a subsidiary of Housing New Zealand, the HLC plans the layout, infrastructure, and amenities whilst private developers build the homes.

Initially plans included some state housing in the development; however, this criticised as an economic mistake by Opposition leader and MP for Helensville (which included Hobsonville at the time) John Key. (Note: John Key argued that including state housing would lower property values in the area.) After the 2008 election, following which Key would serve as prime minister, Key removed the state housing requirements and instead introduced a scheme to help first-time home buyers.

Since 2015 further development has taken place on the Hobsonville peninsula outside of the Hobsonville Point development. With most of Scott Point having been converted from rural to suburban in a decade.

On 6 December 2012 a tornado struck Hobsonville killing three construction workers and damaging over 100 buildings, primarily RNZAF property.

== Demographics ==
Throughout the 19th century Hobsonville was a small settlement; in 1883 13 household heads were listed. In 1906 the number of household heads was 48.

Hobsonville covers 6.42 km^{2} (2.48 sq mi) and had an estimated population of 17,200 as of June 2025, with a population density of 2,679 people per km^{2}.

Historical population
Year	Pop.	±% p.a.
2006	1,608	—
2013	1,692	+0.73%
2018	5,046	+24.43%
2023	14,025	+22.68%
The 2006 population is for a smaller area of 5.71 km^{2}. Source:

Hobsonville had a population of 14,025 in the 2023 New Zealand census, an increase of 8,979 people (177.9%) since the 2018 census, and an increase of 12,333 people (728.9%) since the 2013 census. There were 6,690 males, 7,296 females and 39 people of other genders in 4,977 dwellings. 3.3% of people identified as LGBTIQ+. The median age was 34.5 years (compared with 38.1 years nationally). There were 3,153 people (22.5%) aged under 15 years, 2,205 (15.7%) aged 15 to 29, 7,134 (50.9%) aged 30 to 64, and 1,533 (10.9%) aged 65 or older.

People could identify as more than one ethnicity. The results were 55.3% European (Pākehā); 5.7% Māori; 3.7% Pasifika; 40.6% Asian; 3.7% Middle Eastern, Latin American and African New Zealanders (MELAA); and 2.0% other, which includes people giving their ethnicity as "New Zealander". English was spoken by 91.1%, Māori language by 0.8%, Samoan by 0.5%, and other languages by 37.1%. No language could be spoken by 3.7% (e.g. too young to talk). New Zealand Sign Language was known by 0.2%. The percentage of people born overseas was 49.2, compared with 28.8% nationally.

Religious affiliations were 28.1% Christian, 4.0% Hindu, 2.2% Islam, 0.1% Māori religious beliefs, 2.1% Buddhist, 0.2% New Age, 0.1% Jewish, and 1.2% other religions. People who answered that they had no religion were 57.0%, and 5.0% of people did not answer the census question.

Of those at least 15 years old, 4,017 (36.9%) people had a bachelor's or higher degree, 3,753 (34.5%) had a post-high school certificate or diploma, and 1,920 (17.7%) people exclusively held high school qualifications. The median income was $63,500, compared with $41,500 nationally. 2,688 people (24.7%) earned over $100,000 compared to 12.1% nationally. The employment status of those at least 15 was that 6,918 (63.6%) people were employed full-time, 1,119 (10.3%) were part-time, and 198 (1.8%) were unemployed.

Individual statistical areas
Name	Area (km^{2})	Population	Density (per km^{2})	Dwellings	Median age	Median income
Hobsonville	2.90	1,827	630	612	36.8 years	$52,800
Hobsonville Point Catalina Bay	1.10	3,483	3,167	1,407	35.4 years	$72,400
Hobsonville Point Park	1.03	5,562	5,400	2,061	34.5 years	$65,000
Hobsonville Scott Point	1.38	3,156	2,287	897	32.8 years	$58,300
New Zealand					38.1 years	$41,500

== Economy ==
Historically the Hobsonville economy was made up of pottery works and farming. Later during the early 20th century Hobsonville was growing grass seed and oats at commercial scale. After the end of the Second World War most of the farmland became pasture for use in agriculture. Market gardens were also common in the period following the Second World War to the urbanisation of the area around the start of the 21st century.

== Education ==
Hobsonville has four schools, three primary and one secondary:

- Hobsonville School is a state full primary (Year 1–8) school with a roll of approximately 502 students.
- Hobsonville School first opened in 1875 operating out of the Hobsonville Church. In 1895 the school relocated to its current premises.
- Hobsonville Point Primary School is a state full primary (Year 0–8) school with a roll of approximately 689 students. Opened in February 2013, it was the first school in New Zealand constructed under a public–private partnership, with the school buildings constructed and managed by a private consortium.
- Scott Point School is a state full primary (Year 1–8) school, which opened in temporary buildings in 2021, while the construction of the permanent school was still underway.
- Hobsonville Point Secondary School is a state secondary (Year 9–13) school with a roll of approximately 1,056 students. Opened in February 2014, the school initially served only Year 9, adding years as the 2014 Year 9 cohort moved through. Like its primary counterpart, the school was constructed under a public–private partnership.

All these schools are coeducational. Rolls are as at July 2026.

== Transport ==
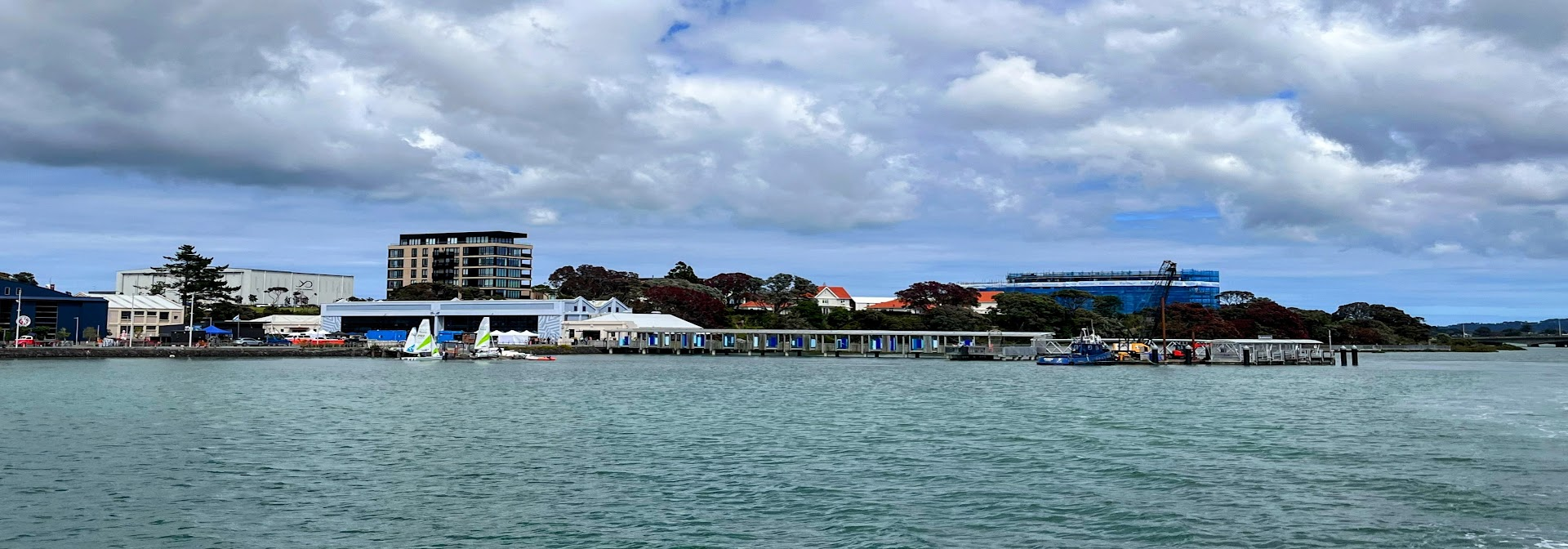
The Hobsonville ferry terminal at Launch Bay

Historically the main form of travel between Hobsonville and the rest of Auckland was via boat at places like Limeburner's Bay, Bruce's Wharf (Launch Bay), and Brickbat Bay. In 1865 there was a weekly ferry service to Riverhead that would sometimes stop at Hobsonville. In 1892 a regular service stopped at Brigham's Creek, Beach Haven, Greenhithe, and Hobsonville. Prior to the ferry service residents had to hire or purchase a boat for transportation.

One of the earliest roads was constructed by the Waitemata County Council after June 1883 to provide access to Bruce's Wharf. Motor vehicles arrived in the 1920s but the first main road was of poor quality. It was not metalled but instead made mostly from clinker with broken pottery and shells for binding also used.

A ferry service runs between Launch Bay, Beach Haven, and the Auckland CBD from Hobsonville following the construction of a ferry wharf in 2013. Hobsonville Marina (formerly Westpark Marina) also runs a service to the CBD. The ferry service had over 15,000 passengers in March 2017.

Hobsonville Road was part of State Highway 18 until the construction of the Upper Harbour Motorway. The Upper Harbour Motorway, connecting the Greenhithe bridge to the end of the Northwestern Motorway, was completed in August 2011, taking 80% of through traffic away from Hobsonville Road.

== Notable places ==
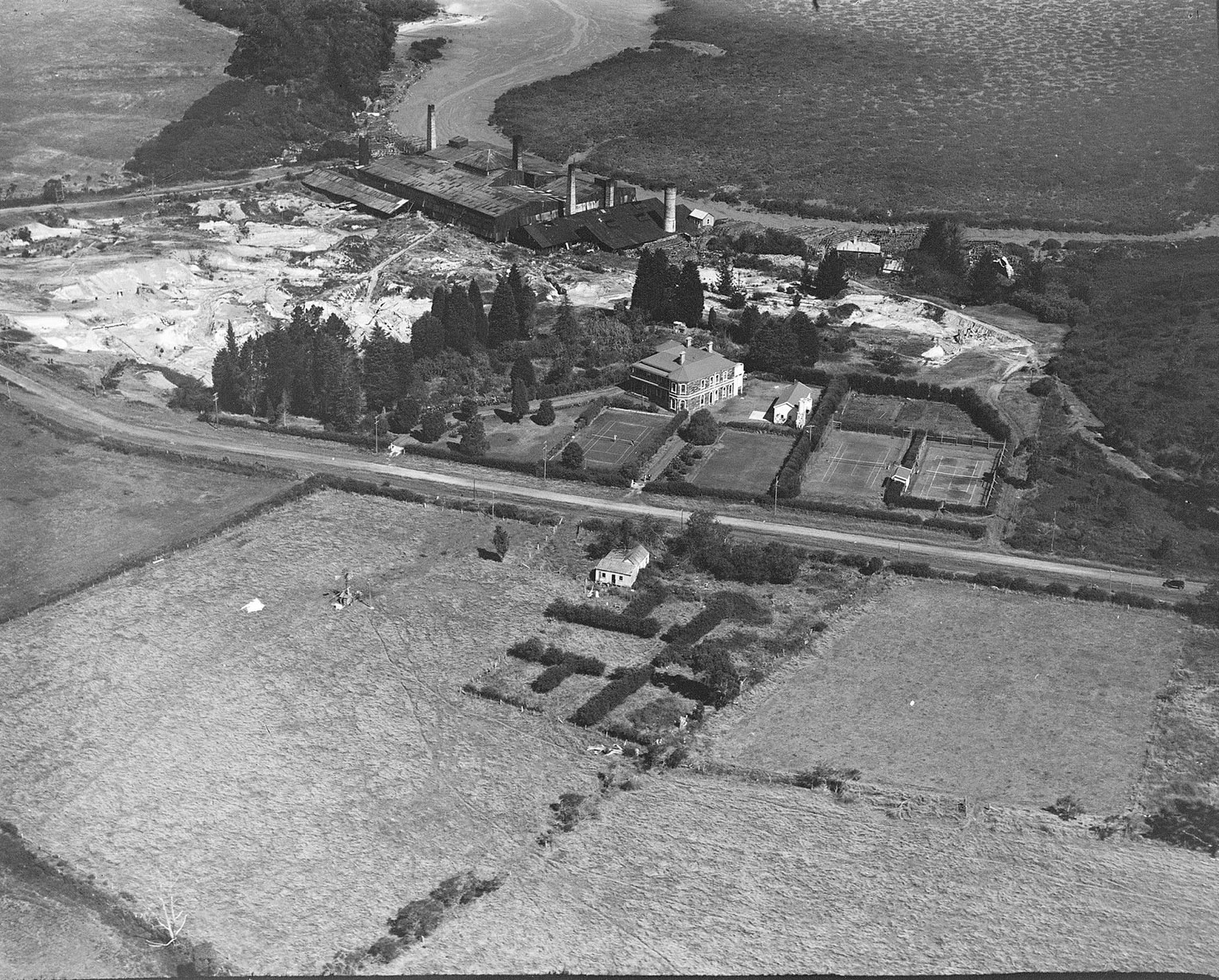
Aerial view of Clark House and Limeburners Bay c.1920

Clark House is a category I listed historic home in Hobsonville. Built by Rice Owen Clark II using a unique design of hollow ceramic blocks, it was later sold and used by the Royal New Zealand Air Force for hosting meetings and housing the Aviation Medicine Unit.

Hobsonville Church & Settlers' Cemetery is a category II listed historic Church and cemetery in Hobsonville. Built by John Danby on land donated by Rice Owen Clark the cemetery is the resting place of many of the original settlers and their families.

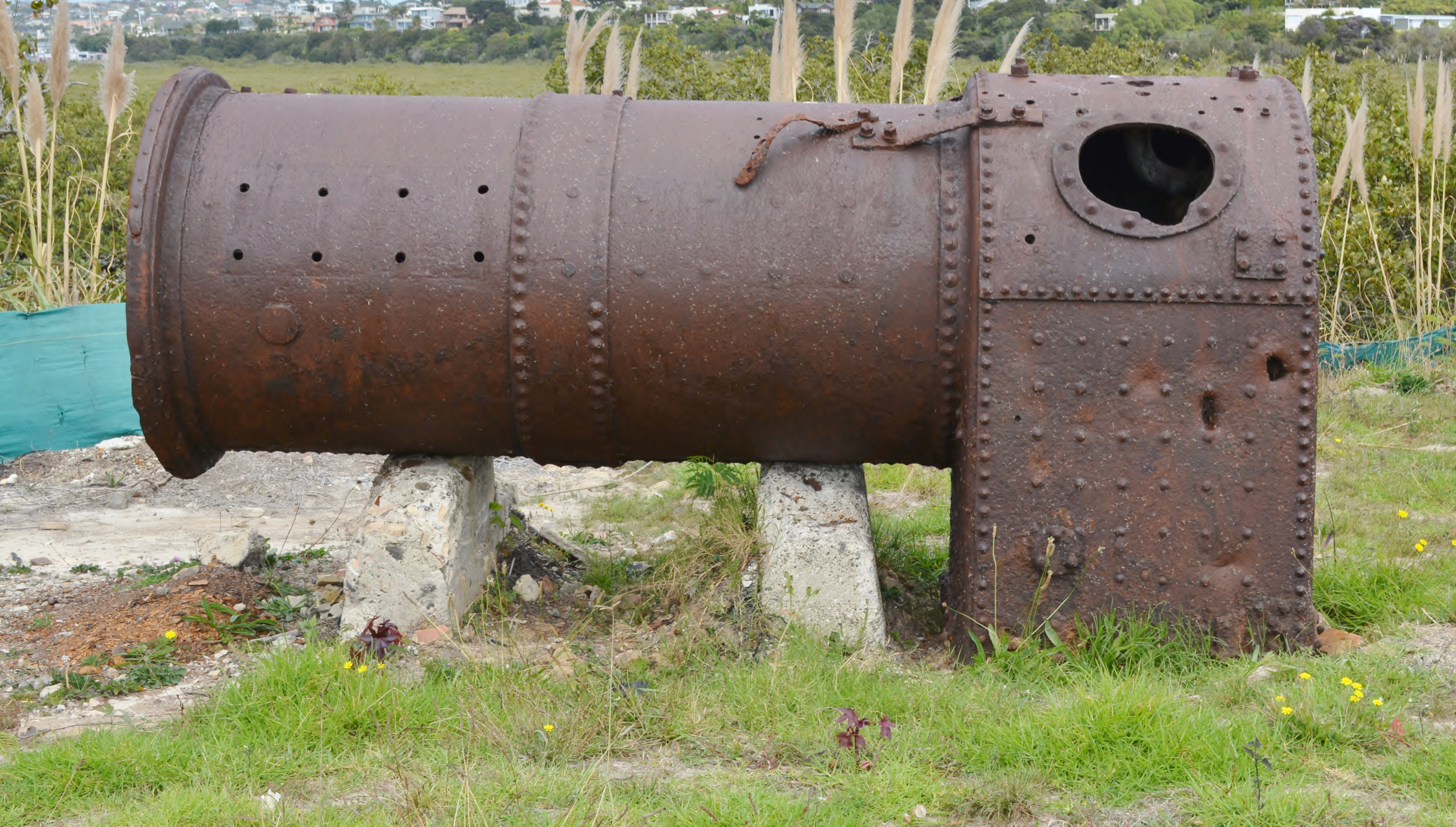
An old boiler used in pottery production at Limeburners Bay

Limeburners Bay is an important cultural heritage site where much of Hobsonville's pottery was made. Clark, Carder, and Holland all had pottery works at Limeburners Bay. Most of the pottery works archaeological remains were damaged or destroyed from the 1960s to 1990s. The site is regarded as one of the most important industrial archaeological sites in New Zealand by the New Zealand Historic Places Trust. Limeburners Bay Historic Reserve is a small part of the foreshore of Limeburners Bay that has been preserved as a Council reserve. The bay houses the wreck of the barge Tongoriro.

Clarks Lane is a small lane in Hobsonville that is classified as historic heritage area by Auckland Council. The area originally contained 11 buildings to house workers for the pottery works but today only five cottages and one villa remain. The site also contains the former Brigham Creek Church which was relocated to the site due to it being within the path of the SH18 upgrade. The cottages date between 1902 and 1928. Two out buildings were constructed with the hollow ceramic blocks but were demolished in the 2000s. As the Upper Harbour Motorway goes between Clarks Lane and the rest of Hobsonville a pedestrian footbridge was constructed over the motorway. The bridge features artwork inspired by the pottery industry in Hobsonville.

The Three Unit House, also known as the Boarding and Engineer's House, is a historic building located on Clarks Road that was built with the same hollow ceramic blocks as Clark House. The house was used to house workers for Clark's pottery works.

Clark Cottage was built for Thomas Edwin Clark and constructed with the unique hollow ceramic blocks.

The GRP building was used by the Air Force to repair engines and other parts.

The seaplane slipway was constructed 1928–1930. It was a slipway for sea planes.

The Sunderland Hanger was built for Tasman Empire Airways Limited who launched sea planes from Hobsonville.

Sunderland Avenue is where junior officers and their families were housed. The homes were built c.1937 in the English Domestic Revival style.

Mill House was built for Doug Mill who operated an aerial surveying business out of Hobsonville.

The Headquarters building is an art deco building with an associated parade ground.

The No 4 Hangar was used to house wasp helicopters. It is now used for ship building.

The married officer houses are 4 houses on Marlborough Crescent. Built between 1925 and 1936 one house was built in the bungalow style and the other three were built in the English Cottage style.

Rozer's House was built by Alex Sinton for the local policeman. The villa later became a restaurant and in 2020 was moved to a property near Hungry Creek in Puhoi when the site was developed for a supermarket.

An Angophora costata tree on Williams Road is scheduled under the Auckland Unitary Plan. The tree is popularly believed to have been planted by William Hobson.

== Amenities ==
The Linear Coastal walkway is a 5 km (3.1 mi) long track around part of the peninsula.

The Hobsonville Marina serves as the local marina for Hobsonville with 592 berths. It was formerly known as Westpark Marina and was created following a 1979 act of parliament for the Waitemata City Council. The marina itself has close to 100 people living on 80 of the boats moored there. A controversy around the marina has developed with the owner of the marina's lease wanting to develop part of it as apartments with the support of Auckland Council property development agency Eke Panuku. A submission on the sale of the land to the developer was opposed by 90% of submitters. Some lawyers stated any sale would be illegal due to the terms of the 1979 parliament act that established the marina as a public asset.
