= Balmoral School =

Primary and intermediate school in Auckland, New Zealand

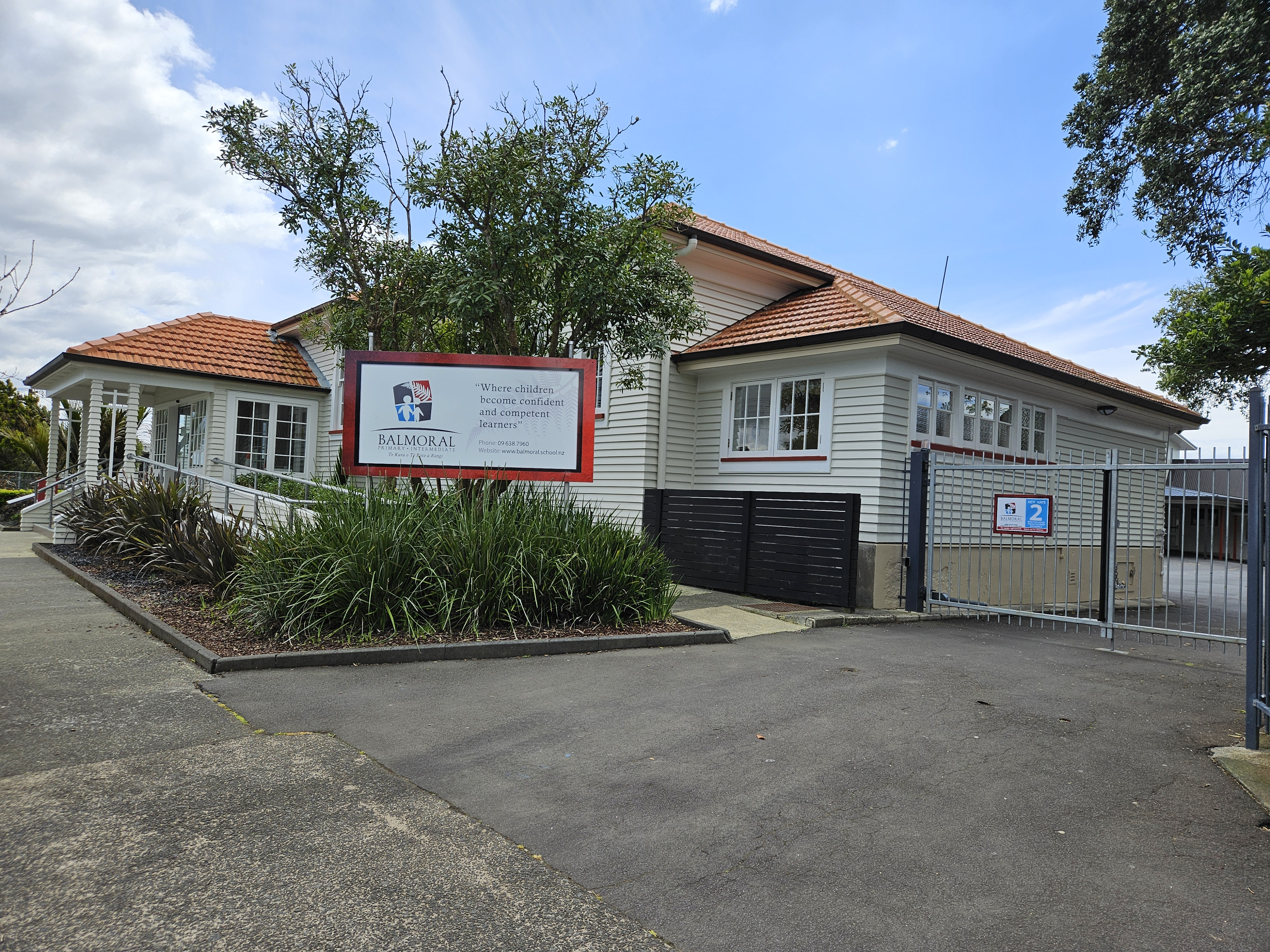

Location
- 19 Brixton Road; Auckland, 1024; New Zealand; 36.88490°S 174.74567°E

Information
- Type: State primary and intermediate
- Established: 1926
- Ministry of Education Institution no.: 1219
- Principal: Malcolm Milner
- Grades: 1–8
- Gender: Coeducational
- Enrolment: 926
- Socio-economic decile: 9
- Website: www.balmoral.school.nz

Balmoral School is a co-educational state primary and intermediate school in Balmoral in Auckland, New Zealand. It teaches students in year levels 1 to 8, however the year 1 to 6 classes of the primary school are separated from the year 7 and 8 classes of the intermediate school. Primary students wear mufti, whilst Intermediate students wear a uniform that consists of a red polo shirt and navy blue shorts. As of November 2018, the school had a population of 926 students.

== History ==
=== Beginnings ===
In 1926, Balmoral School opened as Brixton Road School. The 1920s saw large population growth throughout New Zealand including in suburbs such as Mount Albert and Mount Eden, hence the need for more schools became apparent.

=== Redevelopment ===
In 2015, the green light was given to redevelop some of the school. This redevelopment set out to increase the number of permanent classrooms from 33 to 42, and was prompted by the lack of waterproofing in the existing already ageing buildings as well as the school's continued growth. The estimated cost of the redevelopment was $24M NZD, and construction was planned to start in early 2017. In July 2020, the new intermediate block and new gymnasium were handed over to the school. Construction is now focussing on the construction of a 20 room primary school block.

== Demographics ==
Balmoral School was last evaluated by the Education Review Office in November 2018.

Of the 926 students that attend the school, the report stated that 51% were boys and 49% were girls. The ethnic composition is as follows: 68% New Zealand European (Pākehā), 9% Chinese, 8% Indian, Māori, Samoan and Tongan at 4% each and 3% other ethnic groups.

== Uniform ==
=== Regular uniform ===
There is no required uniform for the primary school. The intermediate school uniform, which is compulsory, consists of a red polo shirt with a navy blue collar and the school's logo situated to the right of the buttons, navy blue shorts that are embroidered with the word 'BALMORAL' in red, and black shoes.

=== PE uniform ===
The primary school's optional physical education (PE) gear consists of a light blue t-shirt that has the student's name (often a surname, first name or nickname) printed on the back. The intermediate school's compulsory PE uniform is a navy blue t-shirt with short sleeves, of which are the colour of the school house group a student is part of. The shorts are also navy blue.

== House groups ==
House groups at Balmoral School compete in a year long competition in which whatever group receives the most points wins. Only intermediate students belong to house groups. House points can be gained in a number of ways, such as the bi-weekly house sports competition where classes compete in mini sports games, during class time and at major school sporting events such as athletics and swimming sports. There are four house groups, as can be seen in the table below.

Balmoral School House Group Information
| | Colour | Māori translation | Motto |
|---|---|---|---|
| Te Ahi | | The Fire | 'Pursue your goals with passion and zest, persevere to achieve your best.' |
| Te Hau | | The Wind | 'Harness energy, strength and force, use them all to stay your course.' |
| Te Wai | | The Water | 'There will be highs, there will be lows, the more we learn the more we grow.' |
| Te Whenua | | The Land | 'For the future we strive, to the challenge we rise.' |

== See also ==
- Balmoral, New Zealand
- Mount Eden
- List of schools in the Auckland region
- Education in New Zealand
