= St Alban the Martyr, New Zealand =

Historic church in Balmoral, Auckland, New Zealand

Church of St Alban the Martyr
- St Albans Church
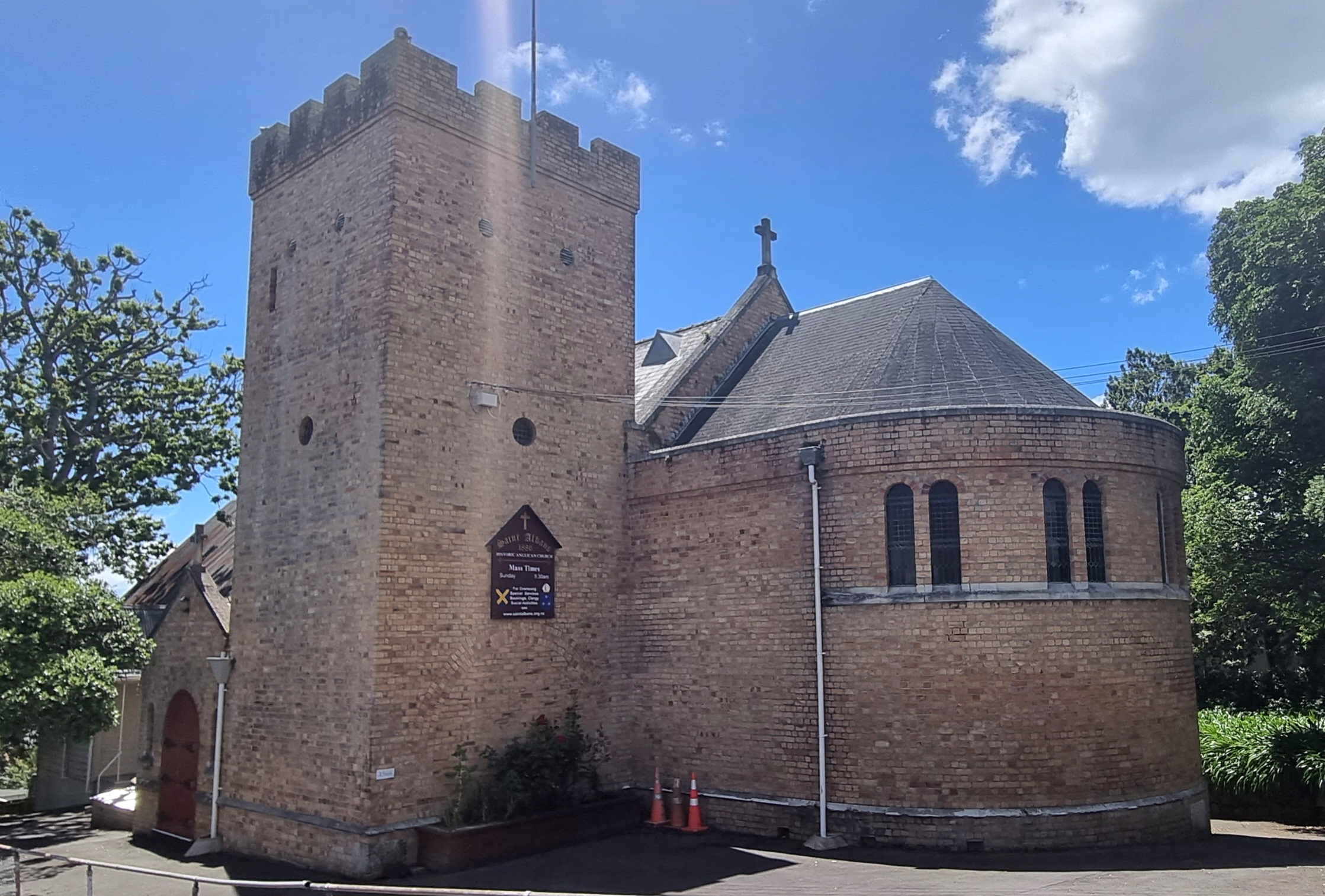
- Church of St Alban the Martyr
- Church of St Alban the Martyr
- 36°53′03″S 174°44′53″E
- Location: Balmoral
- Address: 443 Dominion Road, Mount Eden
- Country: New Zealand
- Denomination: Anglican
- Website: saintalbans.org.nz

History
- Founded: 1886
- Dedication: Saint Alban

Architecture
- Architect: A P Wilson (wooden) Henry Wingfield (brick)
- Style: Romanesque (brick chancel) Norman (tower)
- Years built: 1884–1886
- Construction cost: 500 pounds

Administration
- District: Mission District of Balmoral
- Diocese: Anglican Diocese of Auckland

Heritage New Zealand – Category 2
- Designated: 11 November 1981
- Reference no.: 511

The Church of St Alban the Martyr is a late 19th century Anglican Church located in Balmoral, Auckland, New Zealand listed as a Category 2 building by Heritage New Zealand.

== Description ==
The brick chancel was designed by reverend Wingfield. It is 27 ft (8.2 m) long, 25 ft (7.6 m) wide, and 18.5 ft (5.6 m) high. The roofing of the apse uses fibre cement slates. The foundation stone bears the inscription: 'Ad majorem die glorian. This stone was laid by Moore Richard, Bishop of Auckland. August 5, 1905. Except the Lord build the house, their labour is but lost that build it (Psalm cxxvii).' The original wooden Church is the nave of the current Church.

== History ==
The Church of Saint Alban the Martyr was built in 1885–1886 on land donated by James Paice, a wealthy land owner in the County of Eden, with funds raised by Captain H.G. Ewington. A P Wilson was the architect and it was finished on the 13th of February, 1886. Wilson had initially designed a Gothic Revival Church but this was not carried out. In 1901 the hall attached to the Church was enlarged, with a capacity to seat 400 people.

In early 1905 the Reverend of the Church, Henry Barnard Wingfield, designed a Romanesque brick chancel. Wingfield had studied architecture before his appointment to St Albans. On the 6th of August, 1905, the first brick of the new chancel was laid by the Bishop Neligan. On the 20th of December, 1905, the brick chancel was finished and the Church reopened. The brick apse was completed in c.1905. Originally part of the parish of the Holy Sepulchre, in November, 1909, it was constituted as St Alban's parish. Further work converting the rest of the Church was planned to be carried out but due to funding constraints it was only partially carried out. This work finished on May 28, 1912.

The wooden front was originally intended to also be replaced with brick.

In early 1919 it was proposed that a monument be constructed following peace after the end of the war. Later in 1920 the construction of a tower was proposed. Later the Norman style tower was constructed c.1922 and in 1923 was dedicated to the memory of servicemen who passed in the Great War and later would include servicemen who died in World War II. The tower continues to be a part of Armistice Day celebrations.

In November 1934, the Church celebrated the silver jubilee of the parish.

Since 1950 the Church has allowed other congregations to use the building, including a Russian Orthodox Church.

In March 2011, the General Trust Board of the Anglican Diocese of Auckland issued a notice ordering the closure of the building by the end of April that year over alleged concerns of safety. The priest in charge, Mark Beale, claimed the building passed council safety standards and that the closure was an attempt to sell off the valuable property. As of 2024 the Church is still hosting services.

== Gallery ==
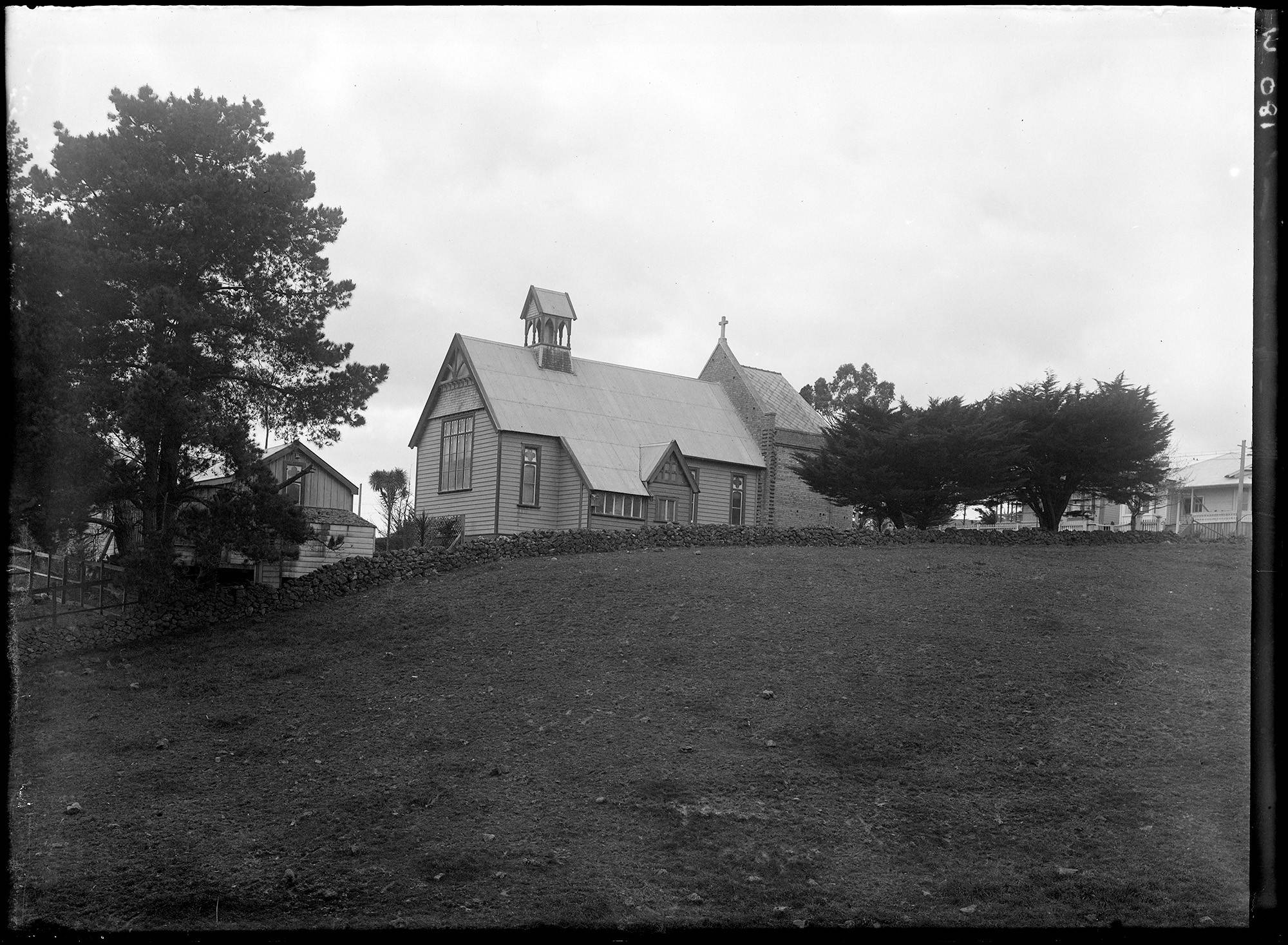
Exterior of original wooden front of St Alban the Martyr

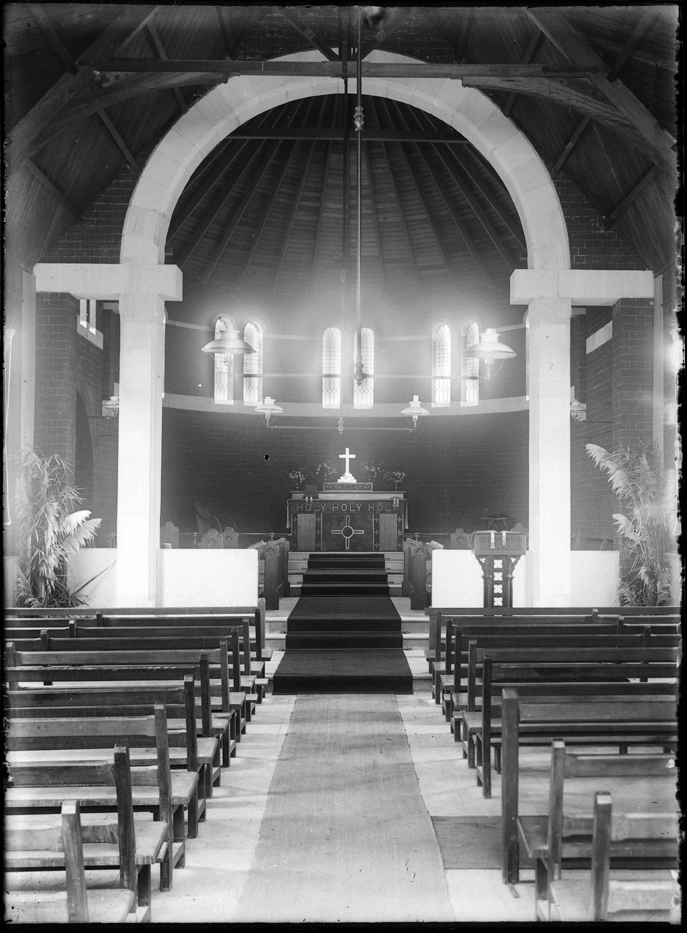
Interior of St Alban the Martyr, 1906

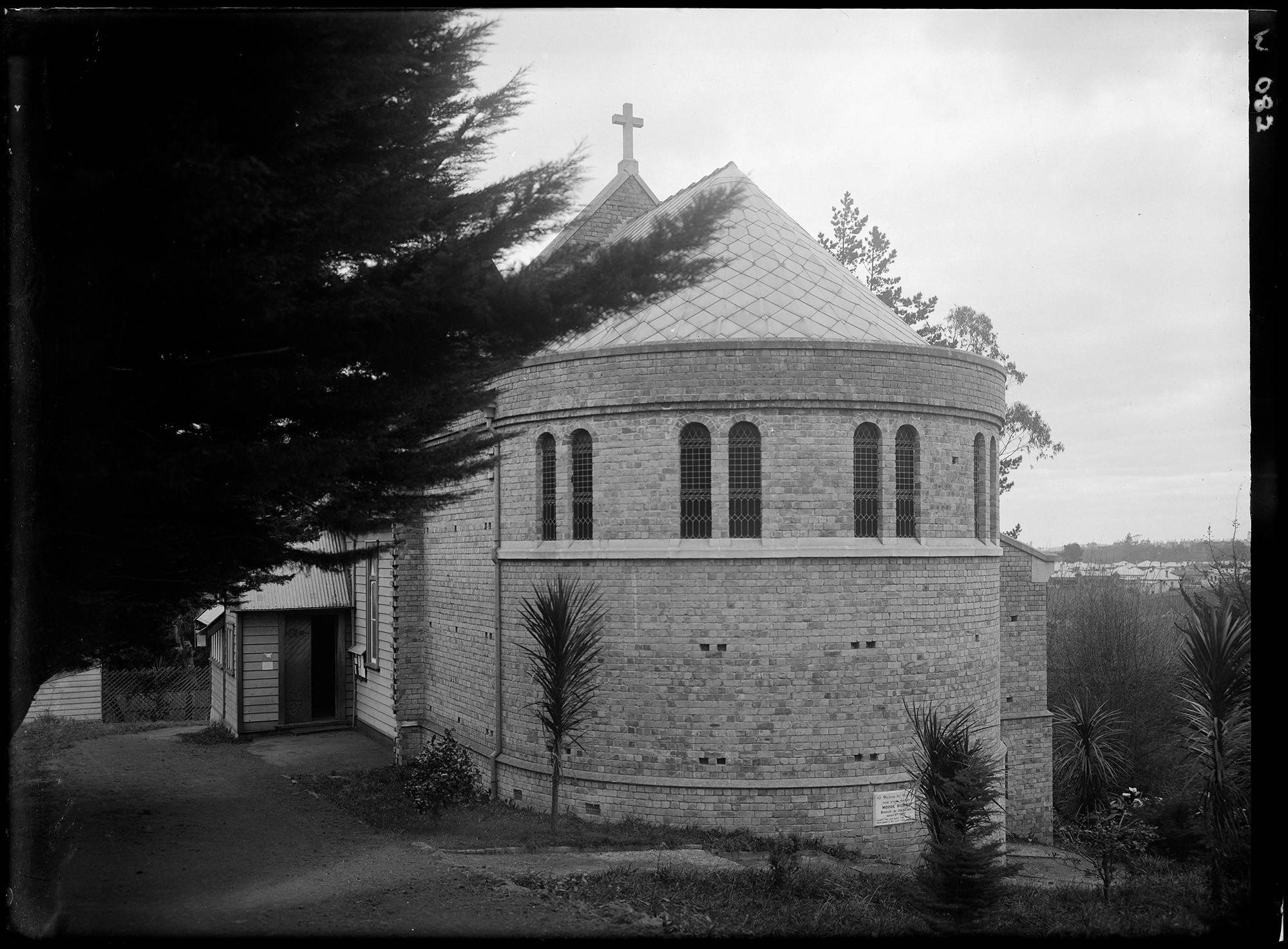
Exterior of St Alban the Martyr before the tower construction
