= Mt Eden Congregational Church =

Church in Mount Eden, New Zealand

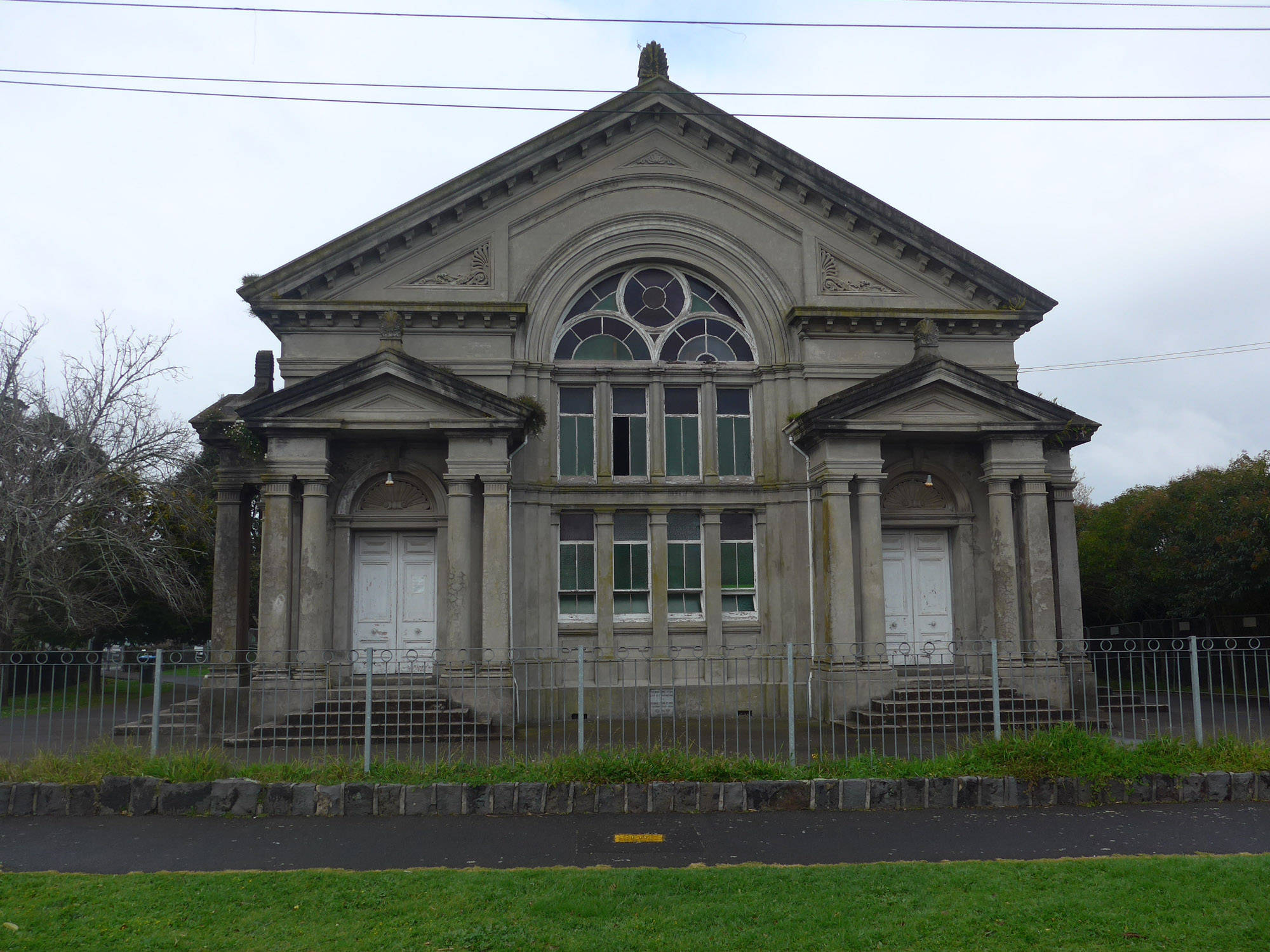
- The church before renovation
- Alternative names: St James Church

General information
- Type: Church
- Architectural style: Neo-classical
- Location: Mount Eden
- Coordinates: 36°52′26″S 174°45′34″E
- Year built: 1900
- Affiliation: Congregational Union of New Zealand (pre-1969), Presbyterian Church of New Zealand (post 1969)

Design and construction
- Architect: Mitchell and Watt

Renovating team
- Renovating firm: Gel Architects

Mt Eden Congregational Church, also known as St James Church, is a historic former church in Mount Eden, Auckland, New Zealand. Constructed in 1900 to a neo-classical design from Mitchell and Watt for a Congregational church it later renamed to St James Church following the 1969 union of Congregational churches with the Presbyterian Church of New Zealand. In the 21st century the church fell into disrepair and as the church could not fund the repairs the building was sold, later being developed into residential apartments.

== Description ==
The church is located at the corner of View and Esplanade Roads. It has a cruciform layout and before conversion had a vestibule, transepts, nave, and chancel. The original slate roofing was replaced with corrugated steel.

A stained glass window memorial window for the First World War I is a replica of a painting by Sir Noel Paton's Lux in Tenebris. Beneath the window is a tablet that says Pro Deo et pro Patria (For God and Country) and the names of the 17 parishioners killed in the war. A smaller tablet commemorates the four whom were killed during the Second World War.

Prior to conversion to apartments the church contained a wooden pulpit from 1900, a sloped floor, and red, pink, and green paintwork for the interior.

== History ==
The Mt Eden Congregational Church branched off from a church in Beresford Street. Using money from the sale of a property on High Street the church obtained the funds to buy the land in Mount Eden and in May 1885, the Mt Eden Congregational Church was formed. The church was built near the back of the site to allow expansion. Designed by Robert Jones Roberts it was an unreinforced concrete building of Victorian Gothic style. It was constructed by Messrs Rose and Clarke and could seat up to 300 worshippers.

In 1900 the church had grown and plans were developed for a new church. The foundation stone was laid by George Fowlds, 13 January 1900. Designed in a neo-classical style by Mitchell and Watt it opened 5 August 1900 and could seat 400.

A roll of honour was revealed on 16 December 1919, it contains the name of 76 parishioners who served in World War I, of whom 17 were killed in action. On 11 March 1923 a stained glass window memorial was installed.

In 1969 the church became St James Church after the merging of Congregational and Presbyterian churches. The church merged with St James Church on Beresford Street. It later became the Mt Eden Pacific Islanders Presbyterian Church in 1979, with a predominantly Cook Islander congregation. In 2007 a historic stone wall around the church was demolished by the church itself, who were unaware of the historicity and legal protection it had. Auckland City Council chose not to fine the church over it.

The church college was demolished in 2012. In the same year the church closed due to an unsafe building notice, although services were still occasionally held into 2017. The congregation sold the property as they could not afford the cost of repairs and restoration work, on condition that the church hall was to be demolished to allow apartments to be built behind the church. The church hall, constructed in 1885 as the original church, was damaged by fire in December 2018 and later demolished. An accelerant was likely used to start the fire. Despite having a category B heritage listing with Auckland Council the Environment Court ruled it could be demolished before the blaze occurred. The fire resulted in Auckland Council abandoning its appeal of the ruling.

Conversion into apartments was carried out by Gel Architects. The stained glass windows were one of few interior features to be preserved during the conversion.

== Gallery ==
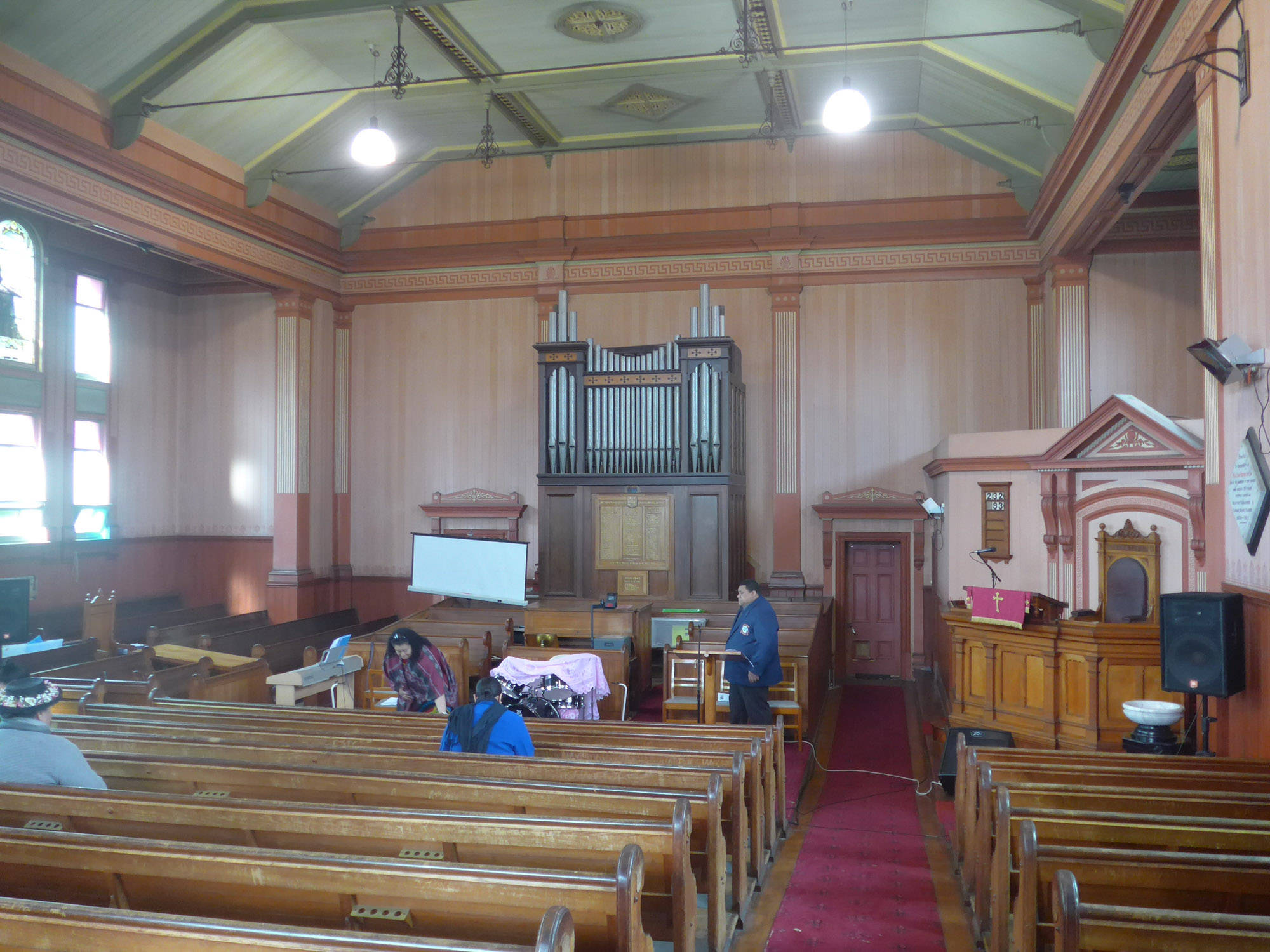
Interior of Mt Eden Congregational Church in 2017

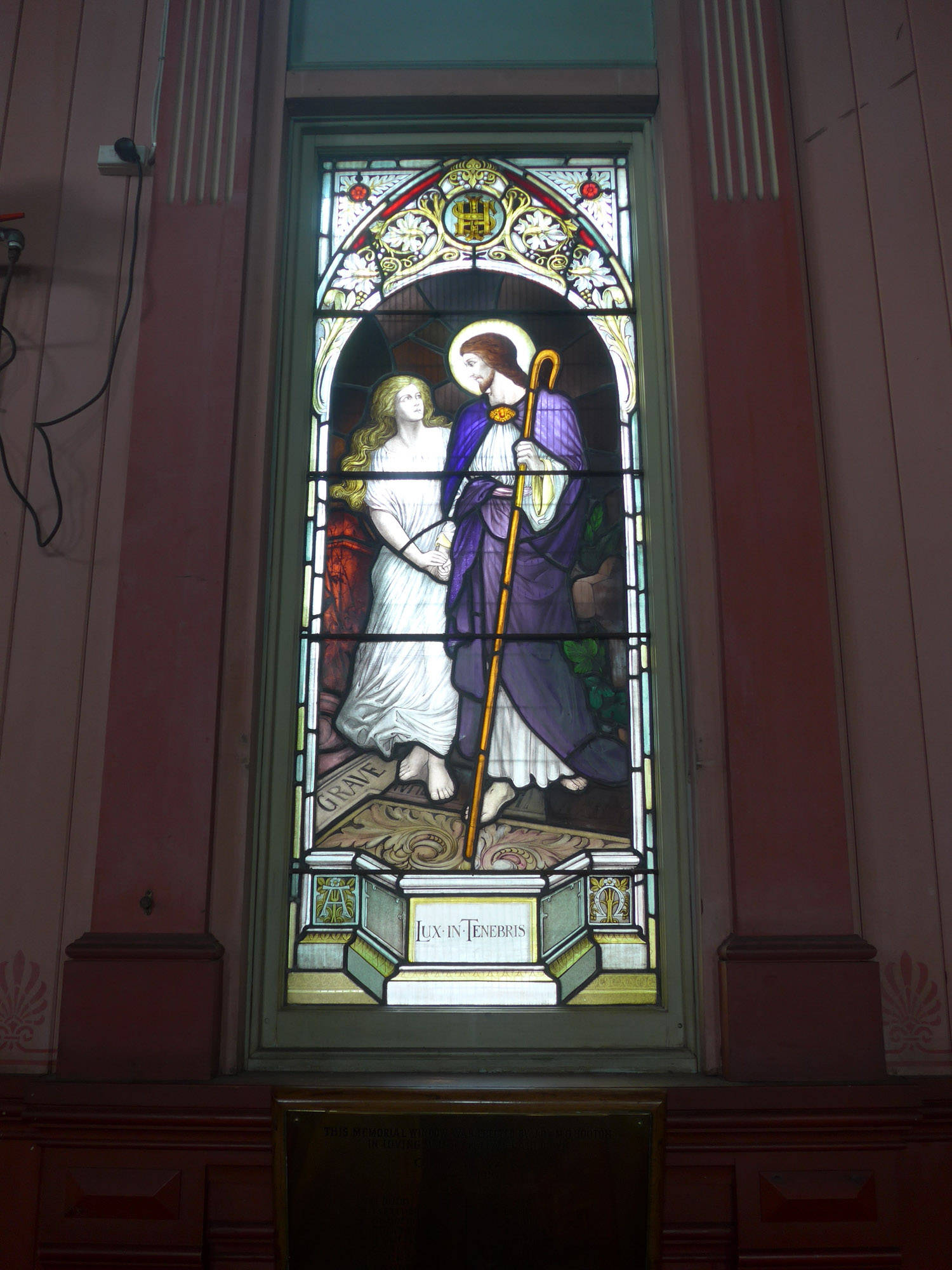
The stained glass windows were one of the few interior features to be preserved during conversion into apartments

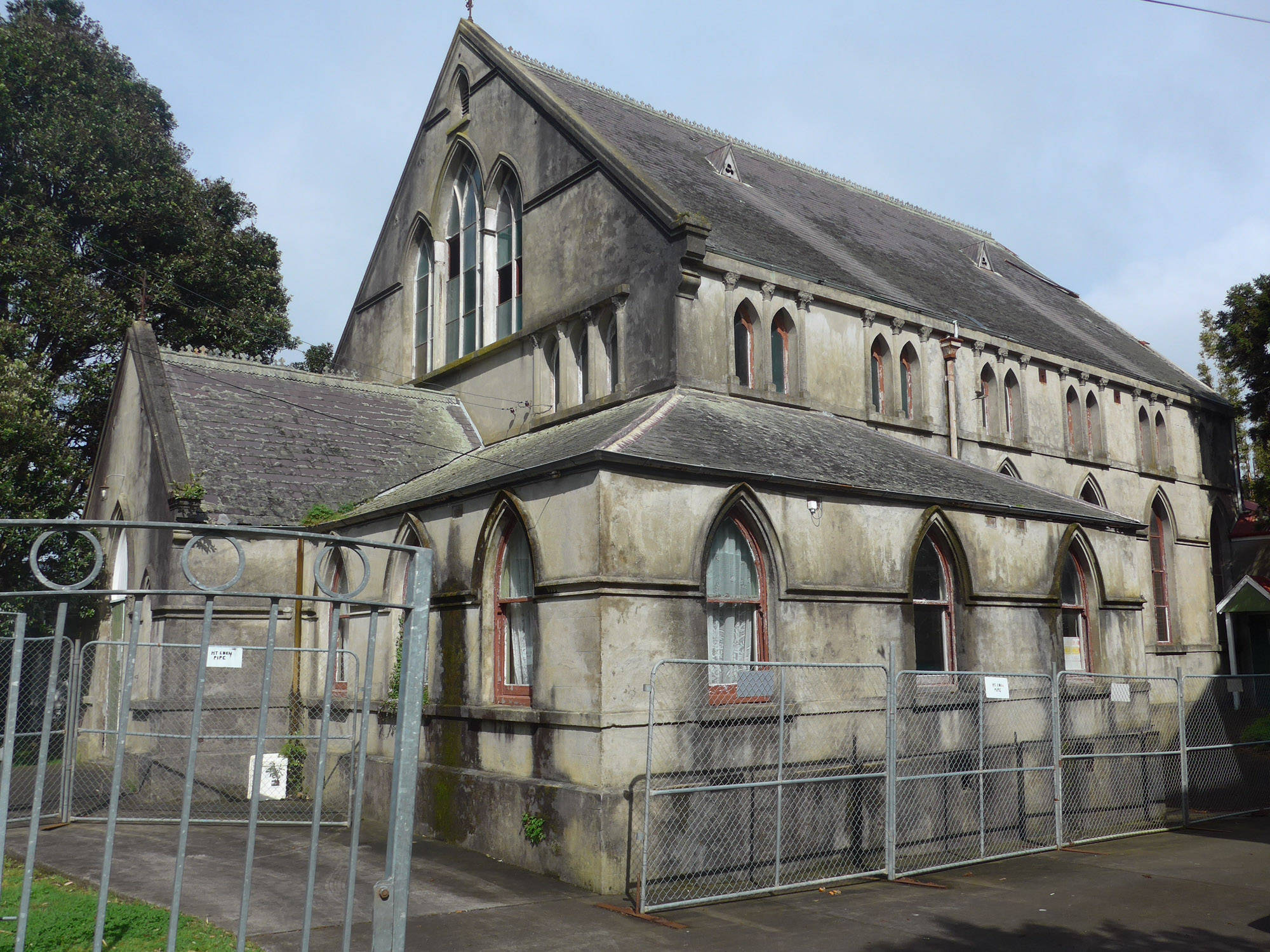
The church hall in 2017, shortly before it was burnt and demolished
