= John Whitney (industrialist) =

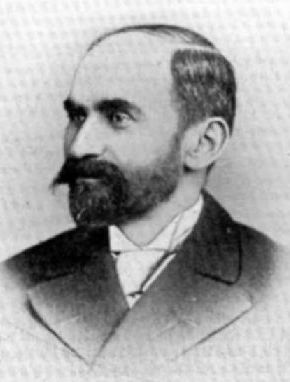
- Portrait of John Whitney
- Born: 27 June 1836; Shrewsbury, Shropshire, England
- Died: 6 September 1932; Remuera, Auckland, New Zealand
- Occupation(s): Industrialist; Soldier

John Whitney (27 June 1836–6 September 1932) was a New Zealand industrialist, who established the Colonial Ammunition Company. Born in England, he served as an officer in the British Army for several years, mainly in Ireland. In 1884 he and his family emigrated to New Zealand. The Panjdeh incident of 1885 saw him join the colonial militia. The crisis also saw Britain temporarily cease its supply of ammunition to New Zealand. To fill the resulting void, Whitney started up a company to manufacture ammunition, and by 1888, this had evolved into the Colonial Ammunition Company. Factories were built in Mount Eden and in Melbourne, Australia, and these supplied ammunition for New Zealand and Australian governments. The company was a major supplier of munitions during the First World War. After Whitney's retirement, the business was run by his son. Whitney died at the age of 96 at Remuera, in Auckland.

== Early life ==
Born on 27 June 1836, John Whitney was the son of James and Sophia Whitney, of Shrewsbury, Shropshire in England. He was educated at schools in Shrewsbury and once his education was completed joined the British Army in 1858. As a commissioned officer in the 10th (North Lincoln) Regiment of Foot, he served mainly in Ireland. Two years after beginning his military service, he married Harriet Musters at Colwick in Nottinghamshire and the couple went on to have six children. Upon the death of his father, he took ownership of the family estate at Calver Hill in Herefordshire.

== New Zealand ==
In 1884, Whitney, having sold the family estate, moved with his family to New Zealand, arriving in Auckland towards the end of the year abroad the Waihora. The following year, the Panjdeh incident erupted, which saw increased tensions between the British Empire and Russia. Whitney joined the New Zealand militia, initially as a captain, and served as a battery commander at Fort Resolution in Auckland. He later served as aide-de-camp to the commander of the New Zealand militia, Major General George Whitmore. As a result of the incident, Britain ceased supplying ammunition to New Zealand, needing to build up its reserves of small arms munitions. This exposed a shortfall in supply of ammunition in New Zealand.

=== Munitions manufacturing ===
Whitney went into partnership with a gunsmith in Auckland, W. H. Hazard, to manufacture munitions. This initial venture failed due to the duo's lack of experience. Hazard withdrew, leaving Whitney with considerable debt. Undeterred he formed a private company, named Whitney and Sons, for the purpose of munitions manufacture. After arranging for the necessary manufacturing equipment to be made locally, he hired 25 staff and went into production at a facility in Mount Eden. His initial workforce was mainly children although following the introduction of legislation in 1891 banning the use of child labour in factories, women made up the majority of his workers.

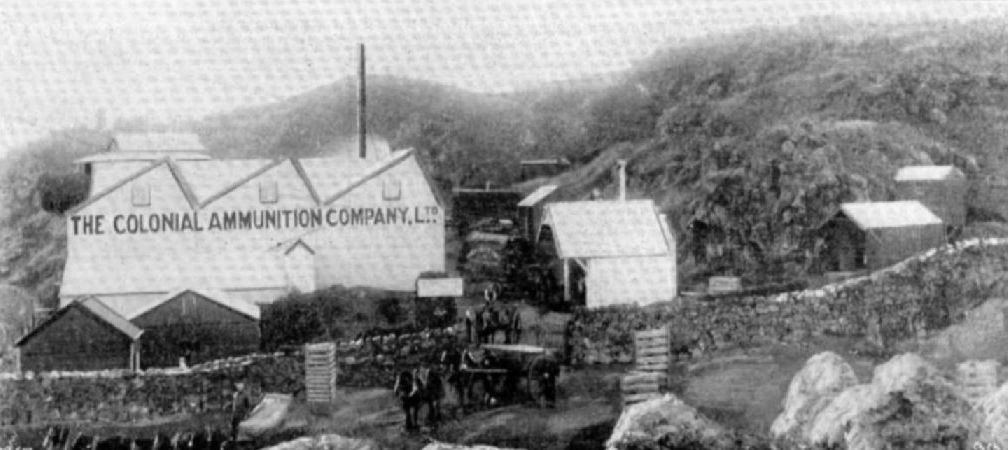
View of the Auckland works of the Colonial Ammunition Company

Whitney was able to begin supplying ammunition, in the form of Snider ball cartridges, to the New Zealand government within twelve months. Despite initial concerns regarding the reliability of the cartridges, demand was high and within two years, two million had been produced. He expanded his facility in Mount Eden with more modern equipment sourced from Britain and in 1888 converted his private company into a limited liability company, named Colonial Ammunition Company Limited (CAC). It was New Zealand's first defence industry. He soon sourced additional manufacturing contracts in Australia and in 1890 established a sister company there, with manufacturing facilities in Footscray, in Melbourne.

Whitney's contracts with the New Zealand and Australian governments were for military munitions, and by 1897 the CAC was producing a million rounds annually for the New Zealand military. However the CAC also manufactured sporting ammunition and by 1900, Whitney's company had established a reputation for quality product in this field. Whitney was involved in research and development of new product, being credited as the inventor of a sharp-pointed .303 bullet; this achieved a flatter trajectory than more conventional bullets. During the First World War, the CAC produced millions of .303 cartridges for the New Zealand Expeditionary Force and the Australian Imperial Force. Employing over 2,000 people, Whitney's company was the only manufacturer of ammunition in the Southern Hemisphere and played a significant role in the economies of both countries.

After the war, the Australian government leased the CAC's Melbourne factory, before purchasing it outright in 1927. By this time, Whitney had restructured the New Zealand arm of his business, returning it to private ownership. When he retired, the CAC was run by one of his sons, and two of his grandsons held management roles.

== Later life ==
In his retirement Whitney lived in Wenderholm, the family home north of Waiwera. He funded the construction of a church in Waiwera. His wife died at Wenderholm in February 1917, and he sold the property afterwards. His final years were spent living in Remuera, where he died at his home on Seaview Road on 6 September 1932. He was survived by four children. He is buried in Clevedon cemetery. His wife is also buried there, alongside a son who predeceased them both in 1891.
