= Mount Eden shot tower =

Former Colonial Ammunition Company Shot Tower

Colonial Ammunition Company Shot Tower
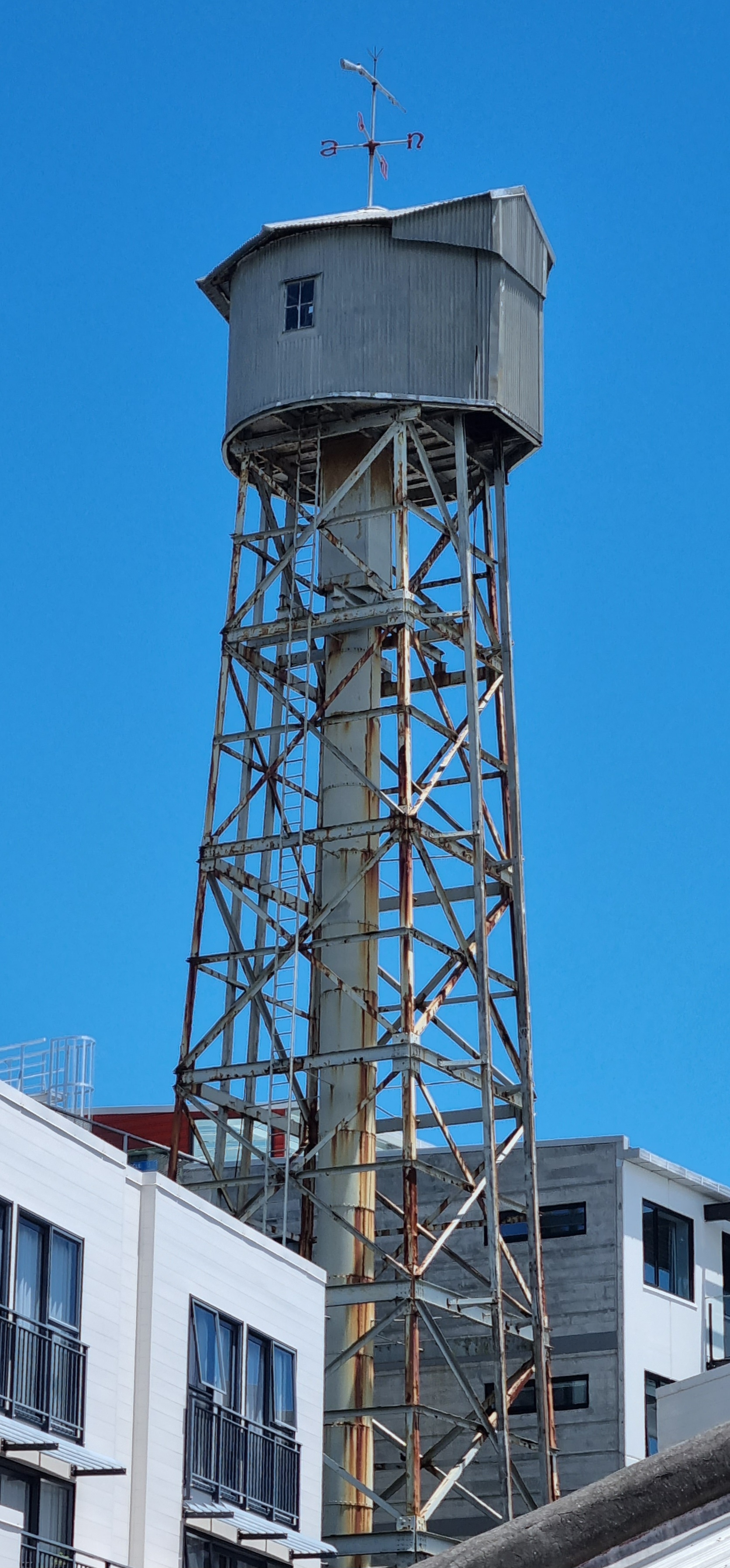
- Interactive map of the Colonial Ammunition Company Shot Tower area

General information
- Location: Mount Eden, 26-30 Normanby Road, Mt Eden, Auckland, New Zealand
- Coordinates: 36°52′07″S 174°45′48″E
- Year built: c.1916
- Demolished: February 2023

Height
- Height: approx. 35 m (38 yd)

Technical details
- Grounds: approx. 100 square metres

Design and construction
- Developer: W. Wilson and Company

Heritage New Zealand – Category 1
- Designated: 11 November 1983
- Reference no.: 87

The Colonial Ammunition Company Shot Tower, also known as the Mount Eden shot tower, was an early 20th century shot tower located in Mount Eden, Auckland, New Zealand and listed as a Category I building by Heritage New Zealand.

The shot tower was originally owned by the Colonial Ammunition Company and was in use until the 1980s. In 2001 the rest of the buildings were demolished but the tower was spared due to popular support for it. In 2023 the shot tower was torn down over concerns it could fall over.

== Description ==
The shot tower was an approx. 35 m (38 yd) tall steel-frame shot tower part of an industrial estate in the borough of Mount Eden. The weathervane was gun-shaped. Before its demolition it was the only shot tower still standing in New Zealand and the only steel-framed shot tower in the Southern hemisphere. In 2002 it was reported there were only 10 steel-framed shot towers left in the world.

== History ==
The shot tower was built in c.1916 by the blacksmiths W. Wilson and Company for the Colonial Ammunition Company due to increased demand for ammunition because of the First World War. It initially produced shotgun cartridges. The tower would be modified over the years as the companies needs changed.

In 1953 an illuminated steel crown was placed on top for Queen Elizabeth's visit to New Zealand. Since 1975 there have been calls to preserve the shot tower. In the 1980s the site was abandoned.

The industrial buildings and tower were planned to be demolished in 2001 to make way for apartments, although the tower remained following public support for retaining it. Property developer Tony Gapes set up a company, Shot Tower Mt Eden Limited, to protect the tower in exchange for Auckland City Council 'waiv[ing] a $526,000 financial contribution due on the apartment'.

Gapes failure to pay rates on the shot tower led to the company going into liquidation and an attempt from liquidators to sell the shot tower. The shot tower was not bought and the company would later dissolve, leading to the shot tower becoming bona vacantia.

In February, 2023, fears the tower might collapse from the approaching Cyclone Gabrielle led to residents in adjacent apartments being evacuated for more than a fortnight. Demolition of the shot tower started on the 21st of February and was completed within the same week. Prior to the demolition a 3d scan of the tower was made and the weathervane was given to Auckland Museum.
