= Frederick Potter =

Frederick Seymour Potter
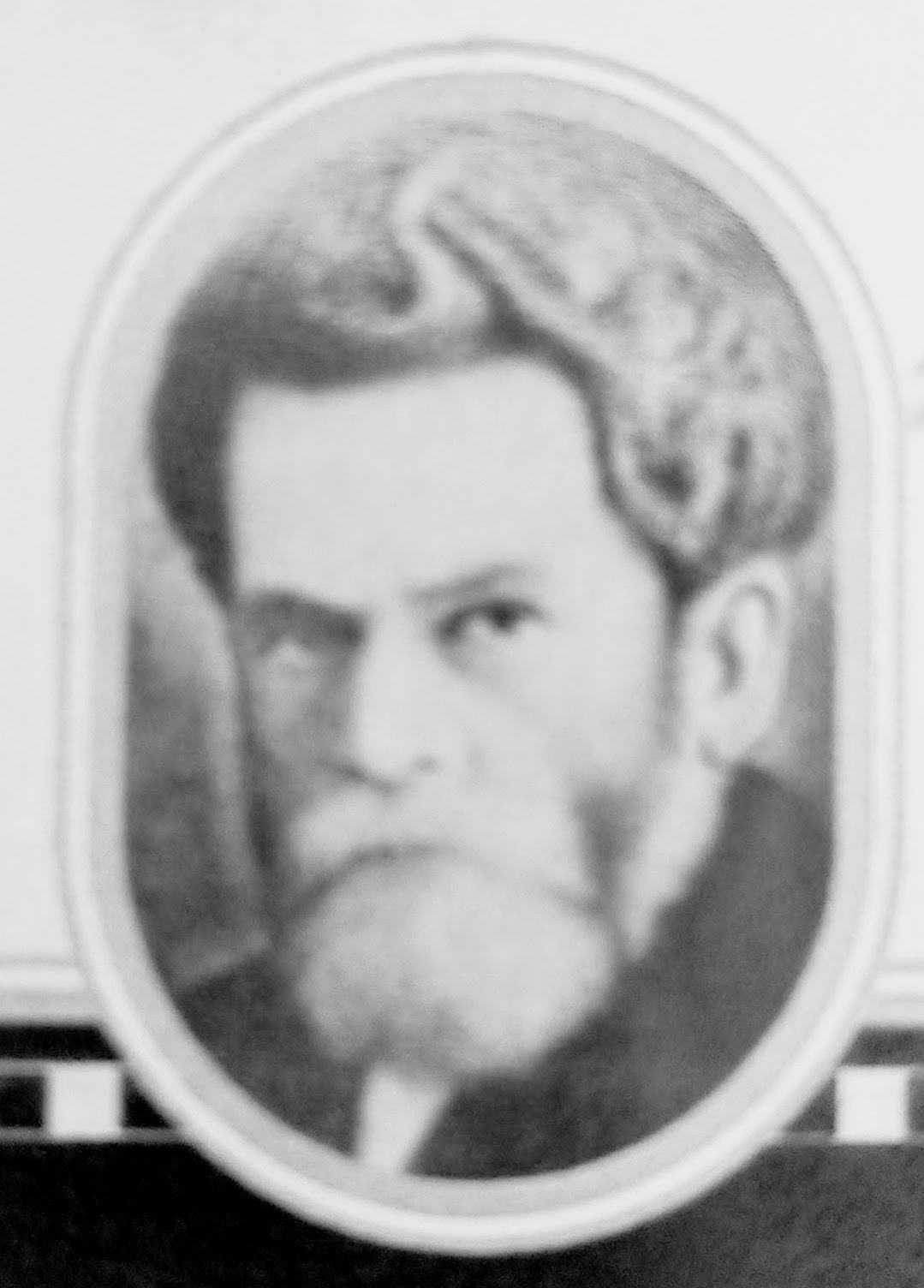

Personal details
- Born: 3 November 1857 London, England
- Died: 29 March 1941 (aged 83)
- Relations: William Potter (father); Eliza Potter (mother)
- Occupation: Businessman

Frederick Seymour Potter (3 November 1857 – 29 March 1941) was a British-born public figure, businessman and benefactor in Auckland, New Zealand.

== Migration to New Zealand ==
Born in London, Potter moved with his parents William and Eliza Potter to Auckland in the steamship Lord Ashley. The family arrived on 14 October 1858. Potter had siblings including his elder brother William.

== Businessman and benefactor ==
Potter listed his occupation in Auckland electoral rolls as "Coachbuilder". In the 1920s he was the proprietor of coachbuilders "Gee and Potter" at 19 Rutland Street, Auckland, on the corner of Lorne and Rutland Streets.

Potter married Ellen Barnes in 1909, who died in 1912 shortly after the birth and death of their son Frederick. In March 1916, Potter gifted much of the lands around his home in Balmoral to establish Potter Park which opened in 1921, however remained a resident of the house that remained on the site of the park. He married Mary Elizabeth Briddock in 1919. He died in Auckland Hospital, in 1941. He was survived by his wife Mary, but no children are listed in his death notices or obituaries.

Potter was a Freemason, and established the Potter Masonic Trust.

== Potters Parks ==
Potter gifted two Potters Parks to the City of Auckland.

- Balmoral Potters Park located at the corner of Balmoral and Dominion Roads: Potters Park, Balmoral, gifted to the Mt Eden Borough Council in 1916, and opened as a park in 1921.
- Takapuna Potters Park located at the corner of Anzac Street and Lake Road.

== Death ==
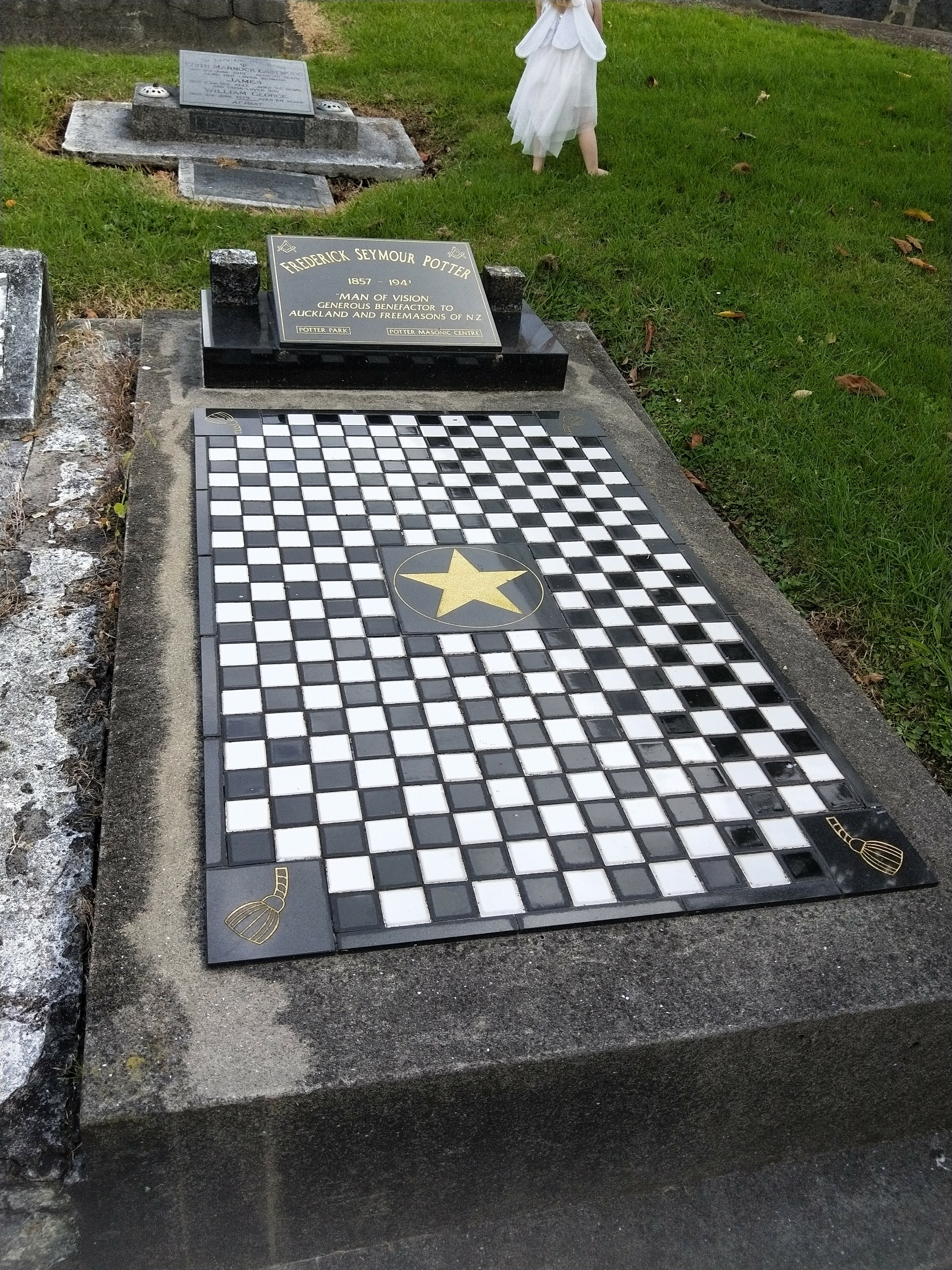
Frederick Seymour Grave

Potter died on 29 March 1941 and his funeral was on 31 March at St Matthias Anglican Church, Panmure. He was buried in front of a large assembly of masons. His obituaries describe him as a "generous benefactor" to the city of Auckland.
