= Mount Eden =

- Suburb
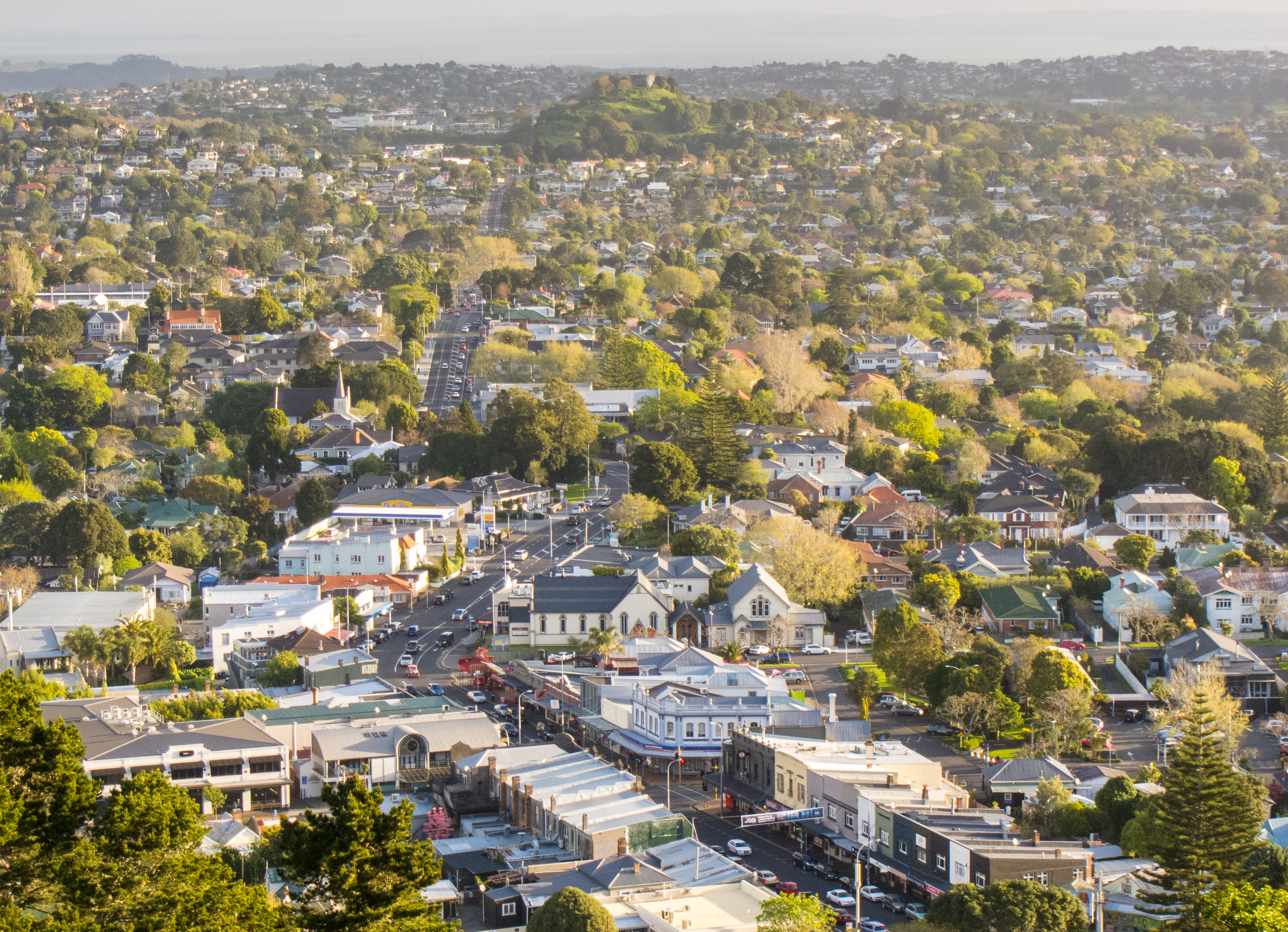
- Mount Eden village seen from Maungawhau / Mount Eden
- Interactive map of Mount Eden
- Coordinates: 36.877°S 174.764°E
- Country: New Zealand
- City: Auckland
- Local authority: Auckland Council
- Electoral ward: Albert-Eden-Puketāpapa ward
- Local board: Albert-Eden Local Board
- Established: 1870s

Area
  - Land: 632 ha (1,560 acres)

Population (June 2025)
  - Total: 25,560
  - Density: 4,040/km^{2} (10,500/sq mi)
- Train stations: Maungawhau railway station

Kingsland	Eden Terrace	Grafton
Morningside	Mount Eden	Newmarket
Sandringham	Balmoral	Epsom

Mount Eden is a suburb in Auckland, New Zealand, whose name honours George Eden, 1st Earl of Auckland. It is 4 kilometres (2.5 mi) south of the Central Business District (CBD). Mt Eden Road winds its way around the side of Mount Eden Domain and continues to weave back and forth as it descends into the valley; it runs south from Eden Terrace to Three Kings. Mt Eden village centre is located roughly between Valley Road and Grange Road. The domain is accessible on foot from many of the surrounding streets, and by vehicle from Mt Eden Road. The central focus of the suburb is Maungawhau / Mount Eden, a dormant volcano whose summit is the highest natural point on the Auckland isthmus.

== History ==
=== Pre-European ===
In pre-European times Mount Eden was utilised as a fortified hill pā by various Māori iwi (tribes). The pā is thought to have been abandoned around 1700 AD after conflict between the resident Waiohua people and the Hauraki tribes The earth ramparts and terraces from this period contribute to the distinctive outline of the hill today.

=== European settlement ===
Following a gift of land from Ngāti Whātua Ōrākei Mount Eden began being subdivided and sold off to settlers in 1841. The land was mostly used for farming to support the Borough of Auckland. Due to population growth in Auckland Mount Eden would start having suburban development in the late 1800s. In 1873, Alfred Cucksey established a store in what would later become Mount Eden Village.

The Colonial Ammunition Company, first formed in 1885, was based at Mount Eden. The steel Mount Eden Shot Tower, completed in 1914, was the major supplier of ammunition in New Zealand until World War II, and was classified as a Category I heritage building by Heritage New Zealand in 1983.

Mount Eden developed from a rural and agricultural area to a suburban one between 1840 and the 20th century. Access to the water supply of the City of Auckland, piped gas from Auckland, and electric trams were some of the main driving factors behind the urbanisation of the area. By 1895 cattle driving was outlawed in the area. By 1930 the last large block of land was subdivided.

Mount Eden is now a "leafy suburb" consisting predominantly of large houses from the first half of the 20th century, many with verdant gardens and large trees. In the 19th century, on the eastern slopes of Mt Eden were constructed several large country houses set in extensive grounds. These included "Harewood House" (since demolished and now the site of Allevia Hospital Epsom (formerly the Mater Misericordiae Hospital), Justice Gillies "Rocklands Hall" (now a hostel), Alfred Buckland's "Highwic" (now a museum), the Hellaby family's "Florence Court", Josiah Clifton Firth's "Clifton House" (both still private residences) and Professor Sir Algernon Thomas' "Trewithiel" (the garden is partially preserved in Withiel Thomas Reserve and the reduced house at 114 Mountain Road). Close by the current Government House (the official Auckland residence of the Governor General) is Eden Garden, an ornamental public garden set up in a disused quarry.

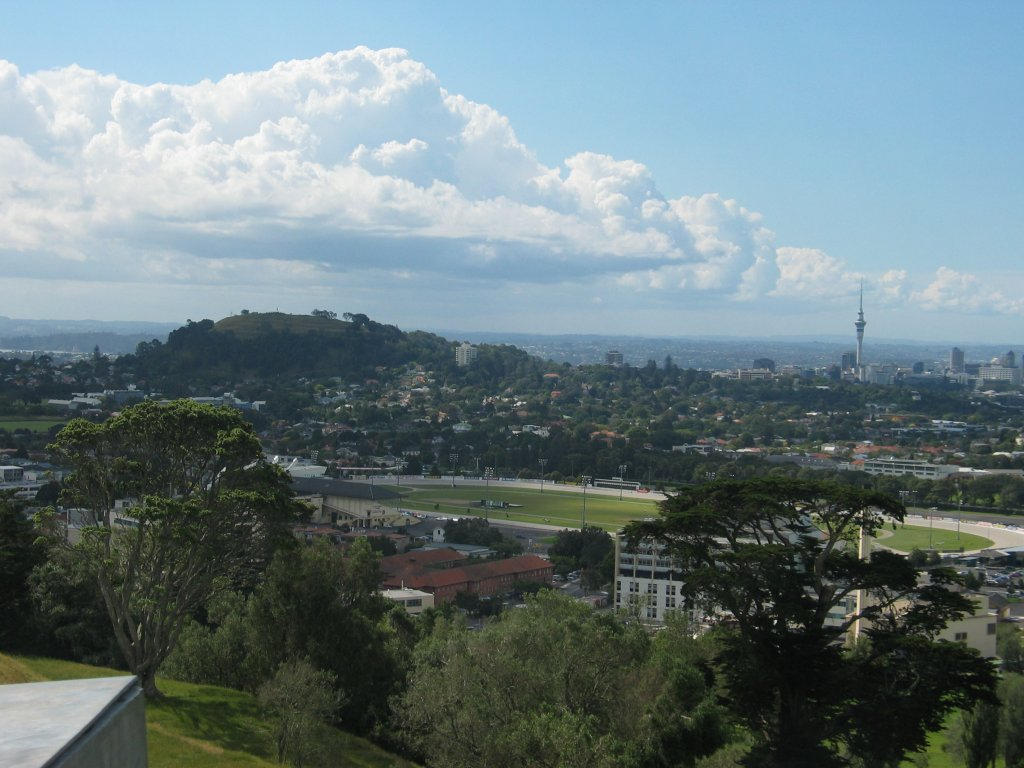
Mount Eden (left, beyond Alexandra Park) from One Tree Hill

In the 1950s and 1960s the inner suburbs became unfashionable and the old houses of the Mt Eden area were comparatively cheap to buy. Mt Eden developed a slightly bohemian image during this time as a community of artists, writers, teachers and university lecturers made it their home. Mt Eden village is still regarded by many as the "Home Of Arts" in Auckland, due to the large amount of creative activity in and around the suburb and the large number of artists who live nearby.

The Presbyterian Boys' Hostel at 22 View Road is a historic building that became the first home for many young men, who moved to Auckland to train in government and industry at low rates of pay.

== Transport ==
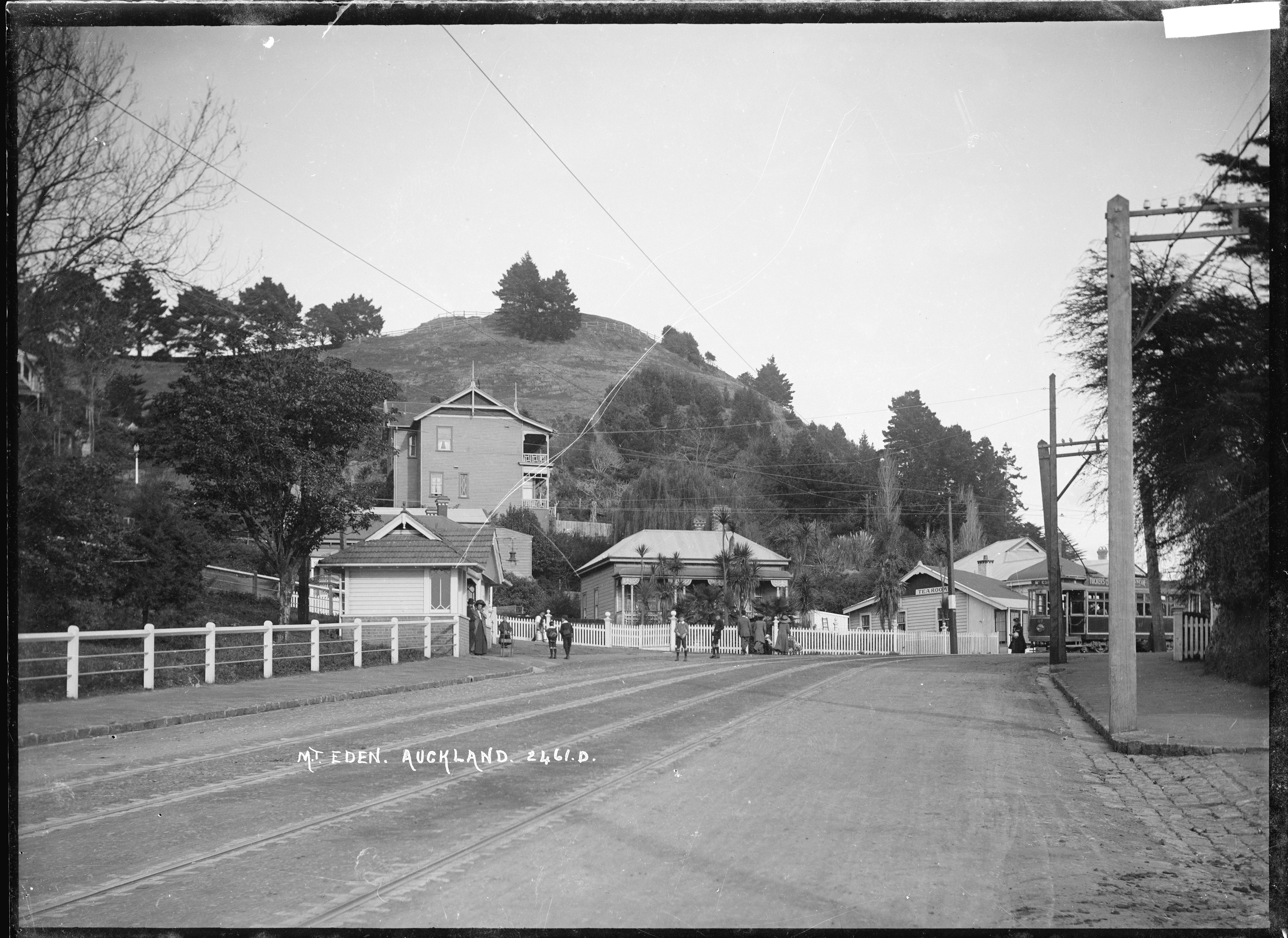
Mount Eden Road in the early 1900s

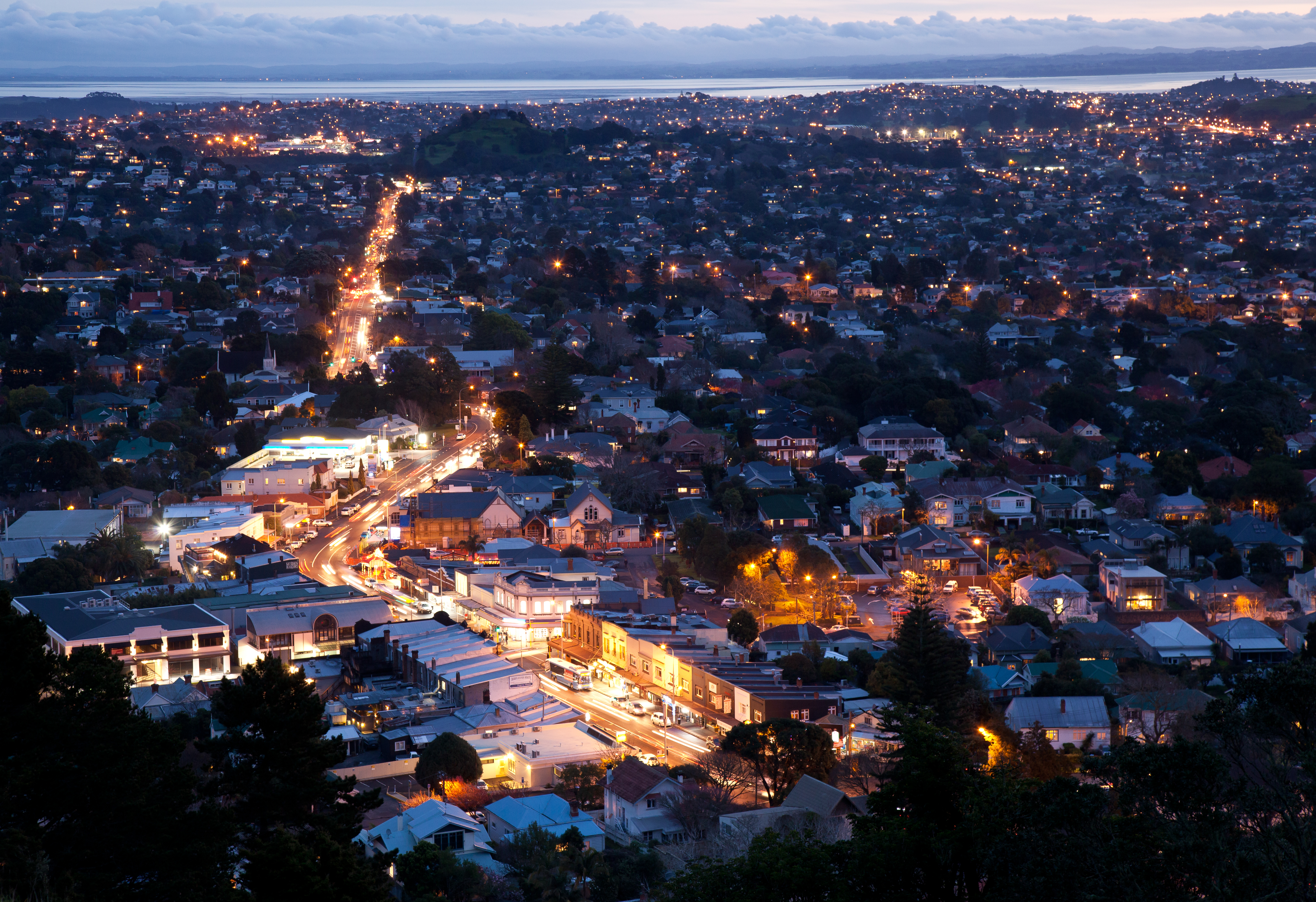
Mount Eden in 2010

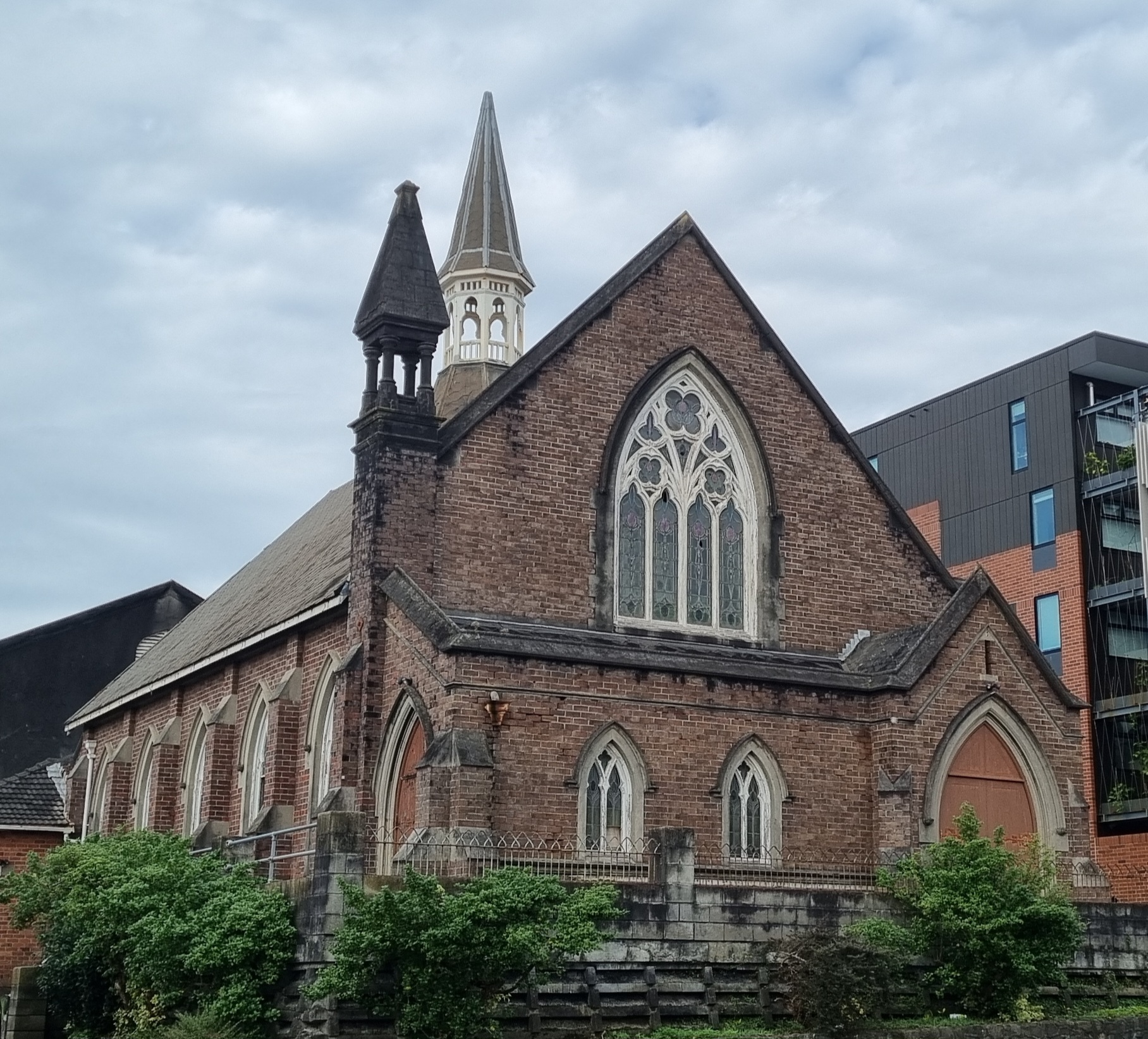
Dominion Road Methodist Church

In Mt Eden, the plentiful supply of volcanic stone (a suitable material for building roads), as well as the ready supply of labourers from the Mt Eden Prison, allowed for a progressive development of early roads, many of which still exist today as main arterial routes. Early roads were metal or made from scoria. Toll gates were established on several main roads, including Mt Eden Road and Dominion Road, during the 19th century in order to help pay for their upkeep.

Public transportation extended from the inner city to the surrounding areas in the late 1870s and early 1880s with horse-drawn buses being the first mode of regular public transportation in the late 1870s. In 1881, a railway opened that connected Newmarket to Helensville and stopped in Mt Eden. At the beginning of the 20th century, trams began connecting Mt. Eden, Balmoral, Kingsland, and Mt Albert with the city. The trams ran for the last time in the 1950s. Trams were replaced with trolley buses. The trolley buses were replaced with diesel buses in the 1970s.

== Local government ==
Mt Eden falls within the Epsom constituencies for the national Parliament. In terms of local government, Mt Eden comes under the Albert-Eden Local Board, of Auckland Council.

During the 19th century, the planning and maintenance of the main arterial roads (Mt Eden Road and Dominion Road) provided the impetus to form local governing bodies in the area. The Mt Eden Highway Board held its first meeting in 1868; it covered the area of Mt Eden, Eden Valley, Sandringham, and Balmoral. At the time, it was responsible for building and maintaining the roads and dealing with the pigs, horses, cattle, and sheep that freely roamed the area. In 1882 it became the Mt Eden Road Board. In 1906 Mt Eden gained borough status and the Mt Eden Borough Council was formed. In 1989 the Borough Council amalgamated with Auckland City Council in a nationwide local government reorganisation. In November 2010, the City Council was dissolved and was incorporated into the new larger Auckland Council.

=== Mayors (1906–1989) ===
- Oliver Nicholson, 1906–1918
- Charles Hudson, 1918–1920
- John Wisdom Shackelford, 1920–1923
- Rev. James Leslie Allan Kayll, 1923–1923
- Ernest Herbert Potter, 1923–1931
- Thomas McNab, 1931–1938
- Robert James Mills, 1938–1950
- Alton Clive Johns, 1950–1959
- Phillip Guy Dickinson, 1959–1962
- Ernest Wilfred Turner, 1962–1968
- Robert Claude Mills, 1968–1974
- Ronald Athol Gribble, 1974–1977
- William Noel Barton, 1977–1983
- Philippa Anne Cunningham, 1983–1986
- Gordon Brayden Johns, 1986–1989

== Housing ==
Housing in Mount Eden ranges from 19th century Victorian villas to modern apartments. Mount Eden's continual development has resulted in a range of types of homes. Some areas such as around Balmoral Road predominantly features villas, whereas areas further from the Auckland city centre are composed primarily of bungalows. The majority of early homes are wooden but two stone homes are still extant. Most of the early homes were constructed from kauri, mataī, and tōtara. King Edward Street and Burnley Terrace have special heritage protections due to their Victorian and Edwardian villas that have remained mostly the same for over a century.

During the 1870s many middle class residents left the urban central city for areas such as Mount Eden due to a desire for healthier living conditions. Many large homesteads were built around this time, although few survive.

Homes in the 20th century were built with a mix of styles including Arts and Crafts, modernism, and Spanish Mission. Traditionally homes were standalone but during the interwar period apartment blocks started being built. Multi unit homes were built more frequently after WW2 but were often derided due to lacking architectural merit. The construction of a high rise apartment around the base of Mount Eden led to restrictions on building height to preserve views of the mountain. The desirability of the area and protections for existing buildings has led to many non-residential buildings being converted into apartments. Notable examples include the former council chambers and fire station and the Mt Eden Congregational Church.

== Economy ==
Initially Mt Eden's economy was based upon agricultural and small shops that serviced residents. With the railway connection in the 1880s industrial businesses start popping up although Mt Eden remained rural. The most notable industrial business was the Colonial Ammunition Company which was formed in 1888 by Major John Whitney. In the 1960s Mount Eden's economy was primarily timber working, engineering products, and warehousing. These manufacturing industries have been gradually shutting down, with former sites being developed into residential housing.

== Demographics ==
Historical population in the Mount Eden Eden Road District and Mount Eden Borough:

- 1878: 733
- 1881: 1135
- 1886: 3144
- 1891: 3136
- 1896: 3677
- 1901: 5129
- 1906: 6888
- 1911: 9381
- 1956: 19,400

Population in the district grew rapidly during a period of economic boom following victory in the New Zealand Wars, Julius Vogel's borrowing of 10 million pounds and investment that followed, and the gold rush at Thames. In the mid-1880s population growth slowed and started to decline as the Long Depression impacted New Zealand. Population growth in the district did not increase until the mid-1890s.

Mount Eden covers 6.32 km^{2} (2.44 sq mi) and had an estimated population of 25,560 as of June 2025, with a population density of 4,044 people per km^{2}.

Historical population
Year	Pop.	±% p.a.
2006	23,505	—
2013	23,598	+0.06%
2018	24,864	+1.05%
2023	24,495	−0.30%
The 2006 population is for a larger area of 6.37 km^{2}. Source:

Mount Eden had a population of 24,495 in the 2023 New Zealand census, a decrease of 369 people (−1.5%) since the 2018 census, and an increase of 897 people (3.8%) since the 2013 census. There were 12,300 males, 12,009 females and 183 people of other genders in 8,535 dwellings. 6.6% of people identified as LGBTIQ+. The median age was 35.6 years (compared with 38.1 years nationally). There were 3,504 people (14.3%) aged under 15 years, 6,297 (25.7%) aged 15 to 29, 11,982 (48.9%) aged 30 to 64, and 2,712 (11.1%) aged 65 or older.

People could identify as more than one ethnicity. The results were 63.8% European (Pākehā); 8.2% Māori; 5.4% Pasifika; 30.1% Asian; 3.1% Middle Eastern, Latin American and African New Zealanders (MELAA); and 2.0% other, which includes people giving their ethnicity as "New Zealander". English was spoken by 94.9%, Māori language by 1.8%, Samoan by 1.1%, and other languages by 28.5%. No language could be spoken by 1.3% (e.g. too young to talk). New Zealand Sign Language was known by 0.4%. The percentage of people born overseas was 40.0, compared with 28.8% nationally.

Religious affiliations were 24.5% Christian, 4.2% Hindu, 1.6% Islam, 0.3% Māori religious beliefs, 1.9% Buddhist, 0.4% New Age, 0.3% Jewish, and 1.8% other religions. People who answered that they had no religion were 59.7%, and 5.3% of people did not answer the census question.

Of those at least 15 years old, 10,611 (50.6%) people had a bachelor's or higher degree, 7,116 (33.9%) had a post-high school certificate or diploma, and 3,267 (15.6%) people exclusively held high school qualifications. The median income was $52,900, compared with $41,500 nationally. 4,689 people (22.3%) earned over $100,000 compared to 12.1% nationally. The employment status of those at least 15 was that 11,961 (57.0%) people were employed full-time, 2,877 (13.7%) were part-time, and 681 (3.2%) were unemployed.

Individual statistical areas
Name	Area (km^{2})	Population	Density (per km^{2})	Dwellings	Median age	Median income
Eden Park	0.51	1,599	3,135	576	33.8 years	$63,500
Eden Valley	0.58	2,160	3,724	780	34.9 years	$49,200
Mount Eden North East	0.41	1,815	4,427	558	33.4 years	$32,900
Mount Eden North	0.87	3,180	3,655	1,323	37.5 years	$50,600
Balmoral	0.78	3,123	4,004	1,056	35.3 years	$49,400
Mount Eden West	0.79	3,399	4,303	1,149	35.8 years	$55,500
Mount Eden East	0.76	2,766	3,639	972	36.4 years	$55,000
Maungawhau	0.73	2,742	3,756	909	36.6 years	$57,000
Mount Eden South	0.87	3,702	4,255	1,215	36.7 years	$55,700
New Zealand					38.1 years	$41,500

== Education ==
Auckland Normal Intermediate is a coeducational intermediate school (years 7–8) with a roll of 743. Mount Eden Normal School is a coeducational contributing primary school (years 1–6) with a roll of 618. The term "Normal" comes from the French term ecole normale and means these schools assist in the training of teachers. Ficino School is a coeducational full primary private school (years 1–8) with a roll of 148. Eden Campus is a Teen Parent Unit which provides secondary education to mothers and early childhood education to their children. It is associated with Auckland Girls' Grammar School. Rolls are as of October 2025.

Mount Eden District Normal Primary School was opened in August 1877 and provided three classes to 23 students in a single room. The original school house was constructed for £287 by John Corwell and is today part of the Valley Road International Church. In 1880 the school was renting space from St Barnabas Church. In 1882 the school had a site on the corner of Valley and Sherbourne Roads and by 1910 was catering for 1,222 students. Other schools were opened to relieve pressure such as Mangawhau School and in 1922, Kowhai Junior High School. The school's buildings were demolished in 1962 and it was reopened 3 years later.

== Notable buildings ==
- Valley Road Church – First school for the area and was also used as a Church, would later be owned by the Free Methodist Church and become known as the 'Mt Eden Methodist Free Church.
- Garage and Marriots building – In 1931 this was built as the first garage and petrol station for the area.
- Essex Road corner building – Italianate building built before 1905 located on the corner of Essex Road and Mt Eden Road.
- Till & Sons – Built in c.1905 in an Italianate style this building used to be a bakery.
- Methodist Church and Sunday School – Built in 1900 as a Church and Sunday school the building would be extended in 1975 and since 2010 has served as a Church and community centre.
- Crystal Palace Theatre – Built in 1928 for the Hippodrome Theatre Company it originally showed live performances but later moved to screening films.
- Greyfriars Church – Designed by Thomas Mullions it was built in 1916 and underwent remodelling in 1958.
- Old Post Office – Built in 1909 the former Post Office the building is no longer a post office.
- Mt Eden Borough Council and Firestation building – Built in 1913 by Wade and Wade architects. In 1940 the building was expanded. By 1970 the firestation had moved and in 1989 the Mt Eden Borough Council was dissolved as part of local government reforms.
- Dominion Road Methodist Church – Church built in 1926 and designed by Arthur White.
- Cucksey's building – Located at the corner of Stokes Road and Mt Eden Road it was built in 1905 to replace the earlier 1873 store.
- Mount Eden Prison – registered as a category 1 building with Heritage New Zealand.
- St Barnabas Church – Bellevue Road, registered as a category 2 building with Heritage New Zealand.
- Auckland Grammar School. The school building is registered as a category 1 building with Heritage New Zealand along with the school's war memorial. The school's janitor house is registered as a category 2 building.
- Mt Eden Congregational Church – Congregational church built in 1900. Converted into apartments.
- Coldicutt House is a Georgian homestead constructed before 1865. It is registered as a category 2 building with Heritage New Zealand.
- Clifton House. – registered as a category 1 building with Heritage New Zealand.
- Colonial Ammunition Company shot tower – registered as a category 1 building with Heritage New Zealand. Now demolished.
- Whare Tane, 26 Clive Road – registered as a category 1 building with Heritage New Zealand.
- Capitol Theatre, 610–612 Dominion Road – registered as a category 2 building with Heritage New Zealand.
- Carey House, 2A Coles Avenue – registered as a category 2 building with Heritage New Zealand.
- Champtaloup House, 621 Mount Eden Road – registered as a category 2 building with Heritage New Zealand.
- Unnamed home, 358 Mount Eden Road – registered as a category 2 building with Heritage New Zealand.
- Church of St Alban the Martyr – registered as a category 2 building with Heritage New Zealand.

== Mount Eden Prison ==
Mount Eden Prison was built in a castle style between 1882 and 1917. It is constructed out of the local basalt rock, one of the very few buildings built in this uncompromising material. Built with prison labour it was designed by P.F.M. Burrows and is similar in appearance to Dartmoor Prison in England.

== Notable places ==
Ballantyne Square is a green space located at the corner of Dominion Road and Ewington Ave. The square provides a respite from surrounding urban activity and is distinguished by its large specimen trees. Ballantyne Square was named after the late Doreen Ballantyne, who was a local councillor from 1965 to 1976.

Bellevue Reserve is a recreational space that has a playground and picnic tables. Originally Bellevue Square was the site of a scoria stone pit, quarried by early landowners, James Walters and his father John Walters in the early 1880s. In 1885 the land was vested as a reserve by the Domain Board. It was levelled and landscaped during the 1920s.

Nicholson Park is a 3.2 hectares (7.9 acres) park that was originally a quarry. The borough council had managed the park since 1922. It is named after Mayor Oliver Nicholson, Nicholson had contributed a sizeable donation towards a children's playground. The park has a bowling club, tennis courts, and a playcentre.

Potters Park is a 3.1 hectares (7.7 acres) park named after Frederick Seymour Potter, who donated the land in 1916. It was formally opened by Governor-General Lord Jellicoe in December 1921. The park has a band rotunda, a children's playground, and a minuscule sculpture.

Eden Garden is a New Zealand memorial garden set in 5.5 hectares (14 acres). It was established in 1964 and is open to the public for an admission fee.. In 1962, the land was gifted to the local community by Frank and Ruby Mappin, who were known to be keen gardeners. At this time, Mappin also donated his neighbouring home to the Crown which is now Government House, Auckland. Construction of the gardens began in 1964 on the land that was a former quarry, led by horticulturalist Jack Clark. Eden Garden was then officially donated to the people of New Zealand in 1965 and has since been managed by The Eden Garden Society, Inc., a not-for-profit charitable organisation. The garden's plants include a large collection of camellias, vireyas (tropical rhododendrons), Japanese maples, magnolias, hibiscus, bromeliads and various native trees.

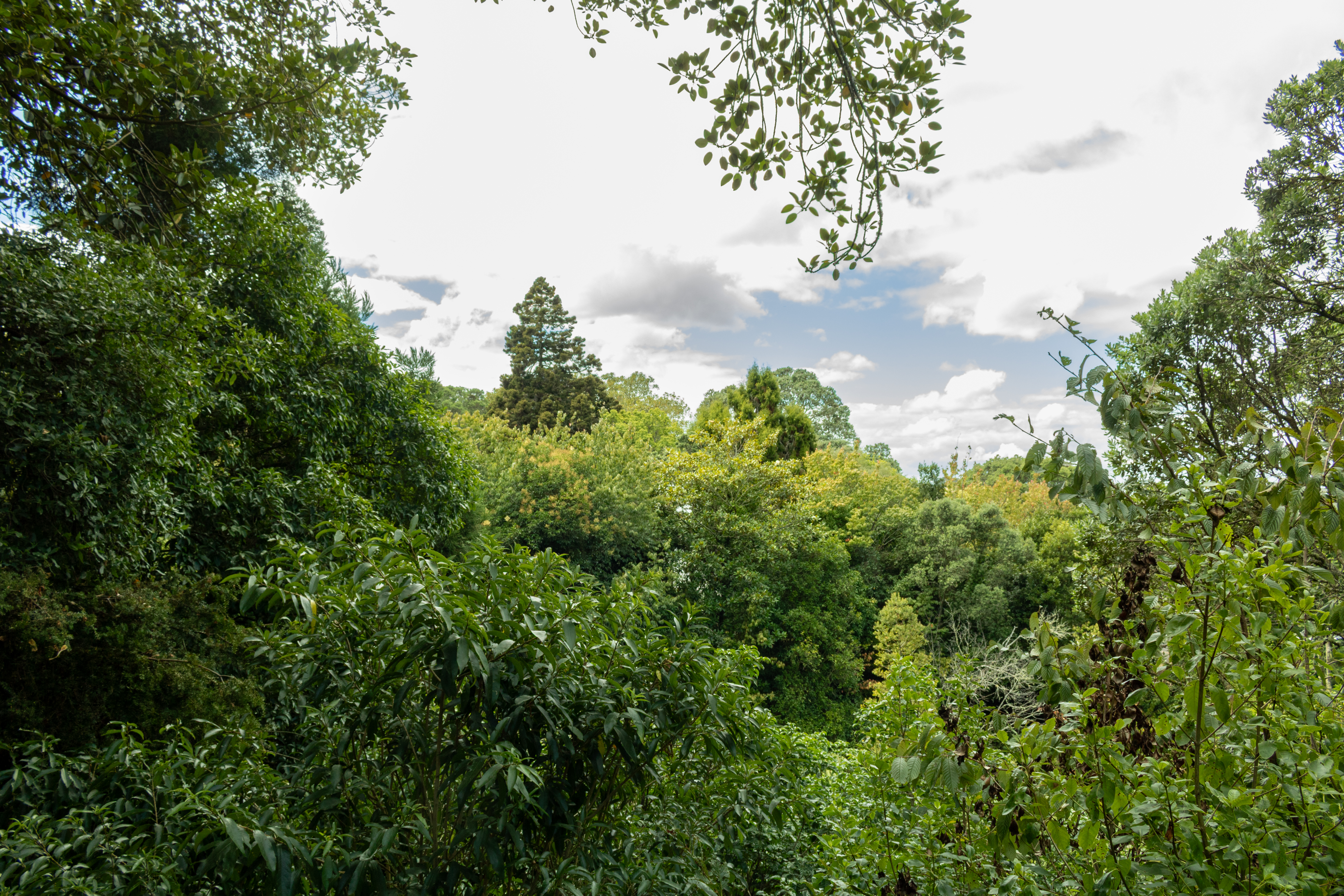
Wilkies Lookout, Eden Garden

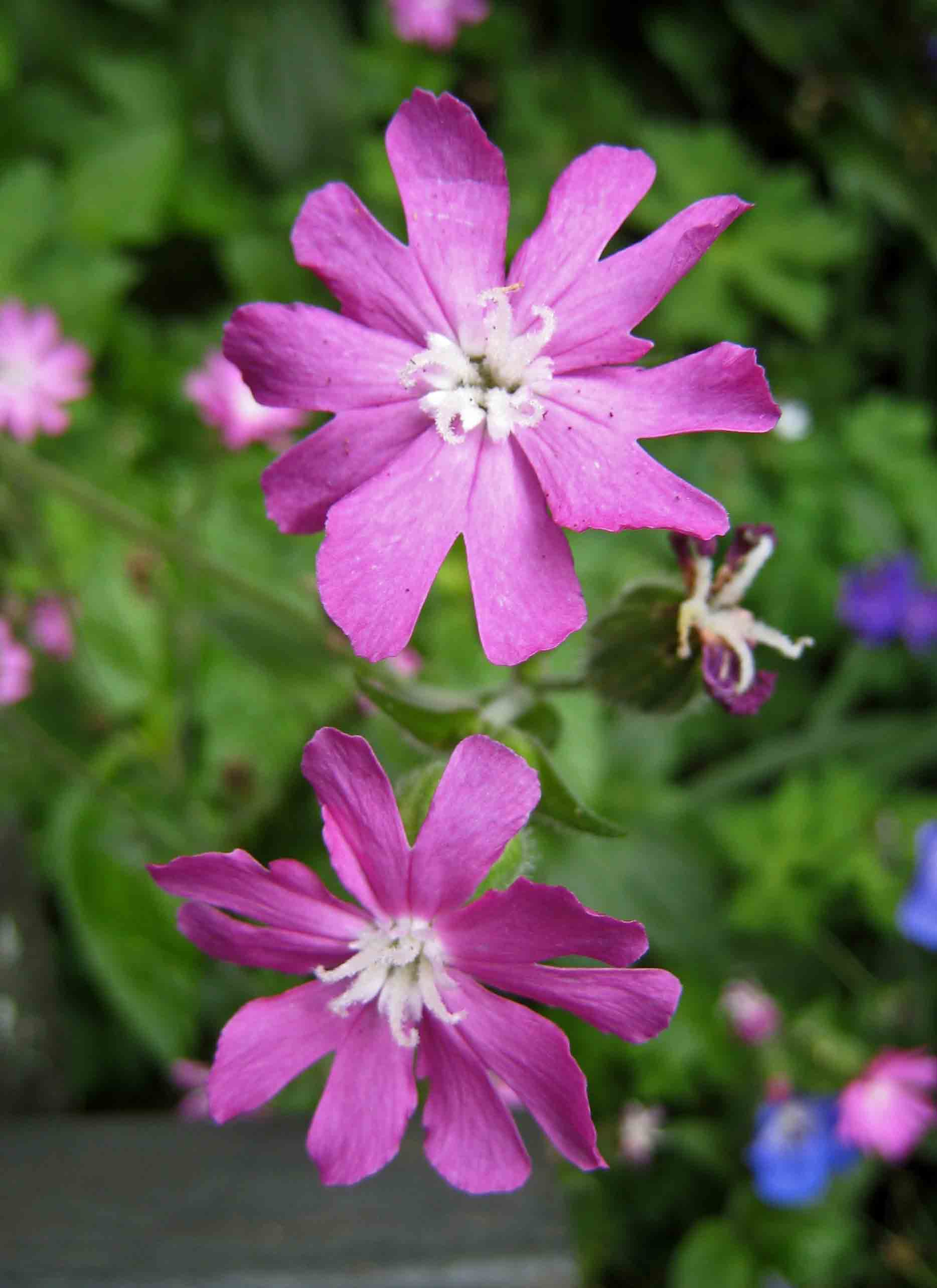
Silene pendula

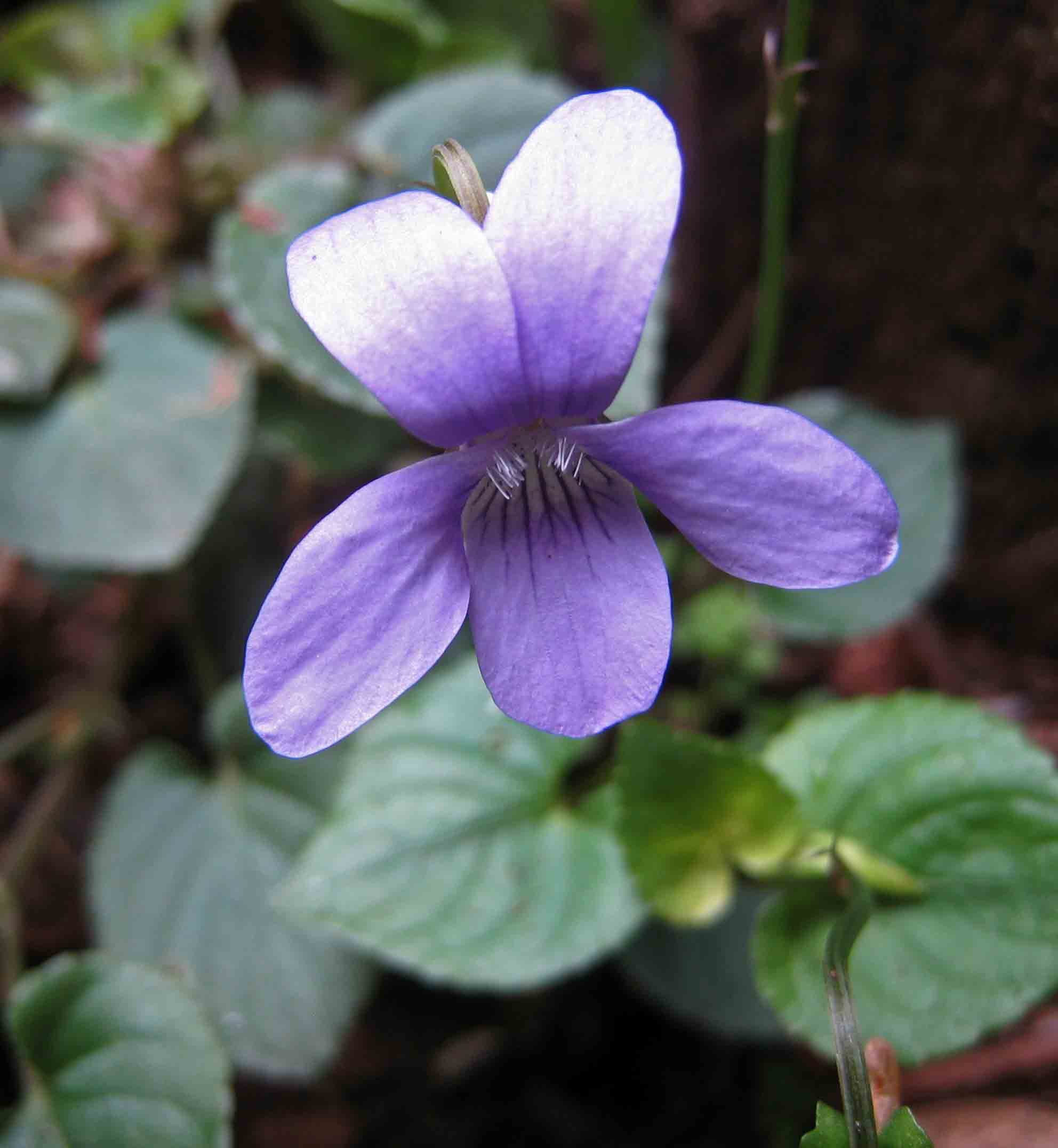
Viola riviniana

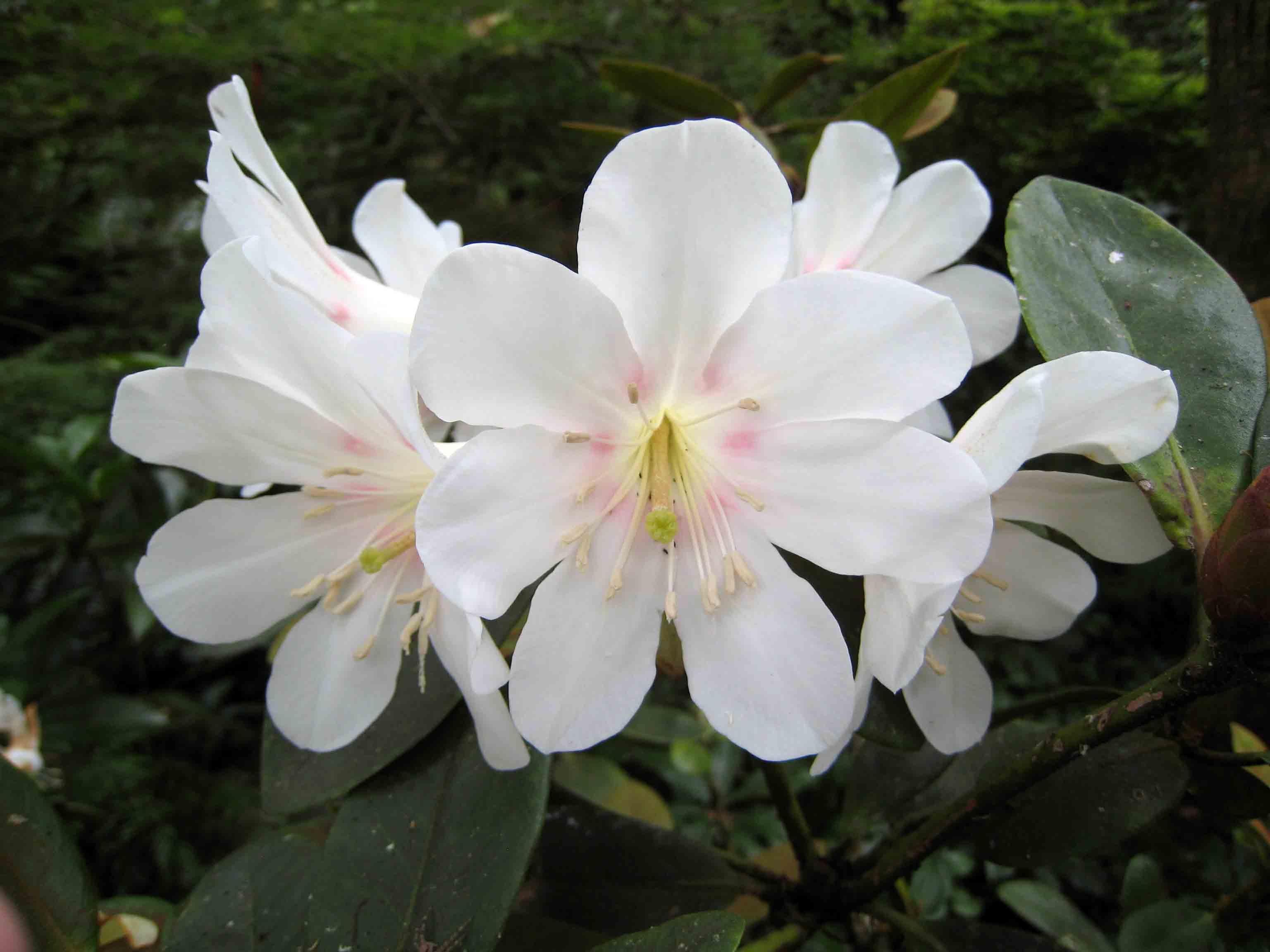
Rhododendron konori

== Notable residents ==
- Professor Sir Algernon Thomas (1857–1937), professor of natural sciences at Auckland University College 1883–1914, lived at Trewithiel on Mountain Road from 1890 until his death.
- Cyril Bassett, – Victoria Cross recipient.
- Charles Edward Button (23 August 1838 – 27 December 1920)- Member of Parliament - Lawyer-Justice Supreme Court- Mayor Birkenhead - Mayor Hokitika - Prospect Terrace.
- James Chapman-Taylor – Architect – designed a set of houses for his family in Valley Road called Pan's Garden.
- Josiah Clifton Firth (1826–1897) – Businessman – Constructed a concrete castle called Clifton House.
- Louis Aldophus Durrieu – Settler – lived on Mount Eden Road.
- William Elliot (c.1864–1934) – Local businessman, Chair of the 1913 Auckland Exhibition.
- Justice Gillies – High Court Judge – Thomas Bannatyne Gillies (1828–1889) Lived at Rocklands Hall on Gillies Avenue.
- William Gummer – Architect – Lived in a house called Stoneways on Mountain Road.
- Amy Hellaby (Amy Maria Briscoe) Widow of Richard Hellaby (Butchery Empire) lived at Bramcote (now Florence Court) Omana Avenue.
- Paul Holmes (1950–2013) – Television journalist
- Trevor Lloyd – Cartoonist for the Dominion Newspaper and seems to be the first to use a kiwi bird as a representation of a New Zealander. Lived in a concrete house he designed himself in Clive Road.
- Sir Frank Mappin (1884–1975) Orchardist, horticulturist, philanthropist – Lived at Birchlands, Mountain Road.
- Lady Mappin – Eliza Ruby Thomson (- 1973). Together with her husband in 1969, donated Birchlands to be the current Auckland Government House.
- Colonel Owens – Landowner – Lived at a house called Brightside in Owens Road.
- Stanley Palmer – Painter
- Ian Scott – Artist, lived and worked on Marsden Avenue 1981 until his death
- Lala Seabrook – Socialite and collector – lived at Florence Court.
- Philip Seabrook ( – 1972) – Director of Seabrook Fowlds Motor Corporation. Lived at Florence Court, Omana Avenue.
- Wolfgang Strauss – Health food manufacturer – political refugee.
- Karl Wolfskehl (1869–1948) German Poet – political refugee.

== See also ==
- Eden (New Zealand electorate)
