= Balmoral, New Zealand =

Balmoral
- Suburb
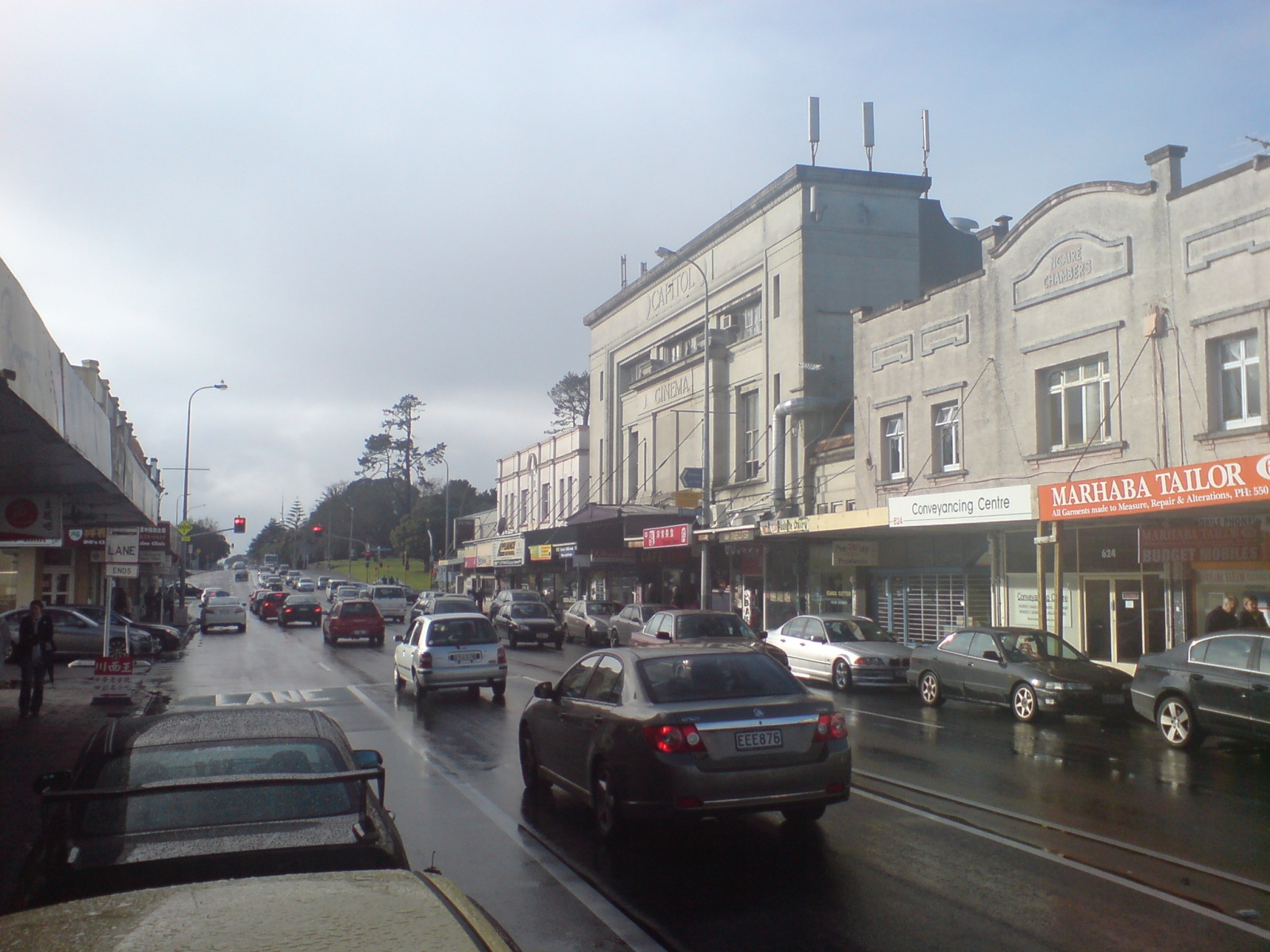
- Interactive map of Balmoral
- Coordinates: 36.887°S 174.748°E
- Country: New Zealand
- City: Auckland
- Local authority: Auckland Council
- Electoral ward: Albert-Eden-Puketāpapa ward
- Local board: Albert-Eden Local Board

Area
  - Land: 238 ha (590 acres)

Population (June 2025)
  - Total: 9,970
  - Density: 4,190/km^{2} (10,800/sq mi)

Morningside	Kingsland	Mount Eden
	Balmoral	Epsom
Sandringham	Mount Roskill	Three Kings

Balmoral is a suburb of Auckland, New Zealand that is bordered by Mount Eden, Epsom, Mount Roskill and Sandringham and is located approximately 5 km from the centre of Auckland. It was named around the turn of the 20th century and derives its name from Balmoral Castle, the Scottish country residence of the Royal family. Much of the housing in the area is from the 1920s and 1930s, often in the Californian Bungalow style. Balmoral was part of Mount Eden Borough Council which became a part of Auckland City in 1989. In November 2010, the area was included into the Albert-Eden-Roskill ward (now Albert-Eden-Puketāpapa ward) of the new Auckland Council.

== Etymology ==
Balmoral is named after Queen Victoria's royal residence: Balmoral Castle.

== Demographics ==
Balmoral covers 2.38 km^{2} (0.92 sq mi) and had an estimated population of 9,970 as of June 2025, with a population density of 4,189 people per km^{2}. Balmoral's demographics are also included in the Mount Eden article.

Historical population
Year	Pop.	±% p.a.
2006	9,387	—
2013	9,720	+0.50%
2018	10,164	+0.90%
2023	9,567	−1.20%

Balmoral had a population of 9,567 in the 2023 New Zealand census, a decrease of 597 people (−5.9%) since the 2018 census, and a decrease of 153 people (−1.6%) since the 2013 census. There were 4,704 males, 4,800 females and 66 people of other genders in 3,180 dwellings. 5.9% of people identified as LGBTIQ+. There were 1,614 people (16.9%) aged under 15 years, 2,313 (24.2%) aged 15 to 29, 4,563 (47.7%) aged 30 to 64, and 1,083 (11.3%) aged 65 or older.

People could identify as more than one ethnicity. The results were 64.1% European (Pākehā); 6.6% Māori; 5.3% Pasifika; 31.8% Asian; 2.8% Middle Eastern, Latin American and African New Zealanders (MELAA); and 1.7% other, which includes people giving their ethnicity as "New Zealander". English was spoken by 94.4%, Māori language by 1.0%, Samoan by 0.9%, and other languages by 28.4%. No language could be spoken by 1.4% (e.g. too young to talk). New Zealand Sign Language was known by 0.3%. The percentage of people born overseas was 39.0, compared with 28.8% nationally.

Religious affiliations were 24.7% Christian, 4.8% Hindu, 1.8% Islam, 0.2% Māori religious beliefs, 2.0% Buddhist, 0.4% New Age, 0.3% Jewish, and 2.0% other religions. People who answered that they had no religion were 59.3%, and 5.0% of people did not answer the census question.

Of those at least 15 years old, 3,981 (50.1%) people had a bachelor's or higher degree, 2,745 (34.5%) had a post-high school certificate or diploma, and 1,224 (15.4%) people exclusively held high school qualifications. 1,896 people (23.8%) earned over $100,000 compared to 12.1% nationally. The employment status of those at least 15 was that 4,620 (58.1%) people were employed full-time, 1,173 (14.7%) were part-time, and 201 (2.5%) were unemployed.

Individual statistical areas
Name	Area (km^{2})	Population	Density (per km^{2})	Dwellings	Median age	Median income
Balmoral	0.78	3,123	4,004	1,056	35.3 years	$49,400
Maungawhau	0.73	2,742	3,756	909	36.6 years	$57,000
Mount Eden South	0.87	3,702	4,255	1,215	36.7 years	$55,700
New Zealand					38.1 years	$41,500

== Notable buildings ==
- Methodist Church - Dominion Road. Red Brick Gothic church built in 1915 to the designs of Arthur White.
- Symphonia Hall - Cnr Dominion Road and St Albans Avenue. Former Cinema now used as the headquarter of the Auckland Philamonia Orchestra.
- Mont-le-Grand Flats - Cnr Dominion and Mont le Grand Roads. A 1930s block of flats. Concrete construction with marsailles tile roof & metal Critical windows.
- Church of St Alban the Martyr. 443 Dominion Road. Anglican Church - part of a worldwide association of congregations associated with St Alban - one of the first Christian martyrs in Britain. The wooden portion of this structure was built in 1884, the brick portion was added in 1905. Several congregations worship here to help make up the twelve acts of public worship that occur throughout every week. These include Hindi speaking Anglicans in Tikanga Pasifika whose Parish is called Anugrah (Grace), also the Eritrean Orthodox originating from North Africa.
- Russian Orthodox Church of the Resurrection (ROCOR) 447A Dominion Rd, Mt Eden, Auckland, New Zealand. Small wooden structure distinguished by the onion dome typical of old Russian architecture.
- The Mount Eden War Memorial Hall - 489 Dominion Road. 1957 modernist building in cream brick. In December 2010, Auckland Theatre Company moved into the lower ground floor of the Hall, refitting it to include their offices and two rehearsal spaces.
- Potter's Park - corner of Dominion and Balmoral Roads. Named after Frederick Potter, one of Balmoral's Victorian landowners who gifted a piece of land for the community.
- The Christmas Tree House - 112 Balmoral Road. 19th century wooden house standing on a very large flat open property surrounded by scoria rock walls. This land is used to grow Xmas trees creating a slightly surreal effect of a white Victorian house in a perpetually unchanging monochrome green landscape. The last remaining example of the open 'empty' landscape which existed here before the 20th century suburban development swamped the area.
- Paddington Square - 149 - 157 Balmoral Road. 1970s development of town Houses on the site of an Edwardian Factory complex.
- The Capitol - 614 Dominion Road. A 1920s cinema built in the neo-Greek style. The Capitol is the oldest theatre in the area.
- Balmoral Baptist Church. 682 Dominion Road. Cnr Dominion and Queens Road. 1960s modernist building in concrete and red brick.
- Brazier Bookshop. 714 Dominion Road. Bookshop run by the parents of Graham Brazier-New Zealand musician
- Church of the Nazarene. 675 Dominion Road. Cnr Dominion Road and Telford Avenue.
- Cheapside - 727 and 771 Dominion Road. A pair of 1920s block of shops in the Spanish Mission style.

== Education ==
Balmoral School is a full primary school catering for years 1–8. It has 769 students. It started as Brixton School in 1926.

Maungawhau School is a contributing primary school for years 1–6 and has a roll of 654. It was founded in 1912.

Good Shepherd School is a state-integrated Catholic contributing primary school for years 1–6, with 182 students. It opened in 1912.

Balmoral Seventh-day Adventist School is a state-integrated full primary school for years 1–8 run by the Seventh-day Adventist church. It has a roll of 65. It was established in 1950 from the amalgamation of three earlier SDA schools.

All these schools are coeducational. Rolls are as of July 2026.

The local secondary schools are Mount Albert Grammar School, Marist College, Auckland Grammar School and St Peter's College.
