= Kashin (elephant) =

Elephant (1968–2009)

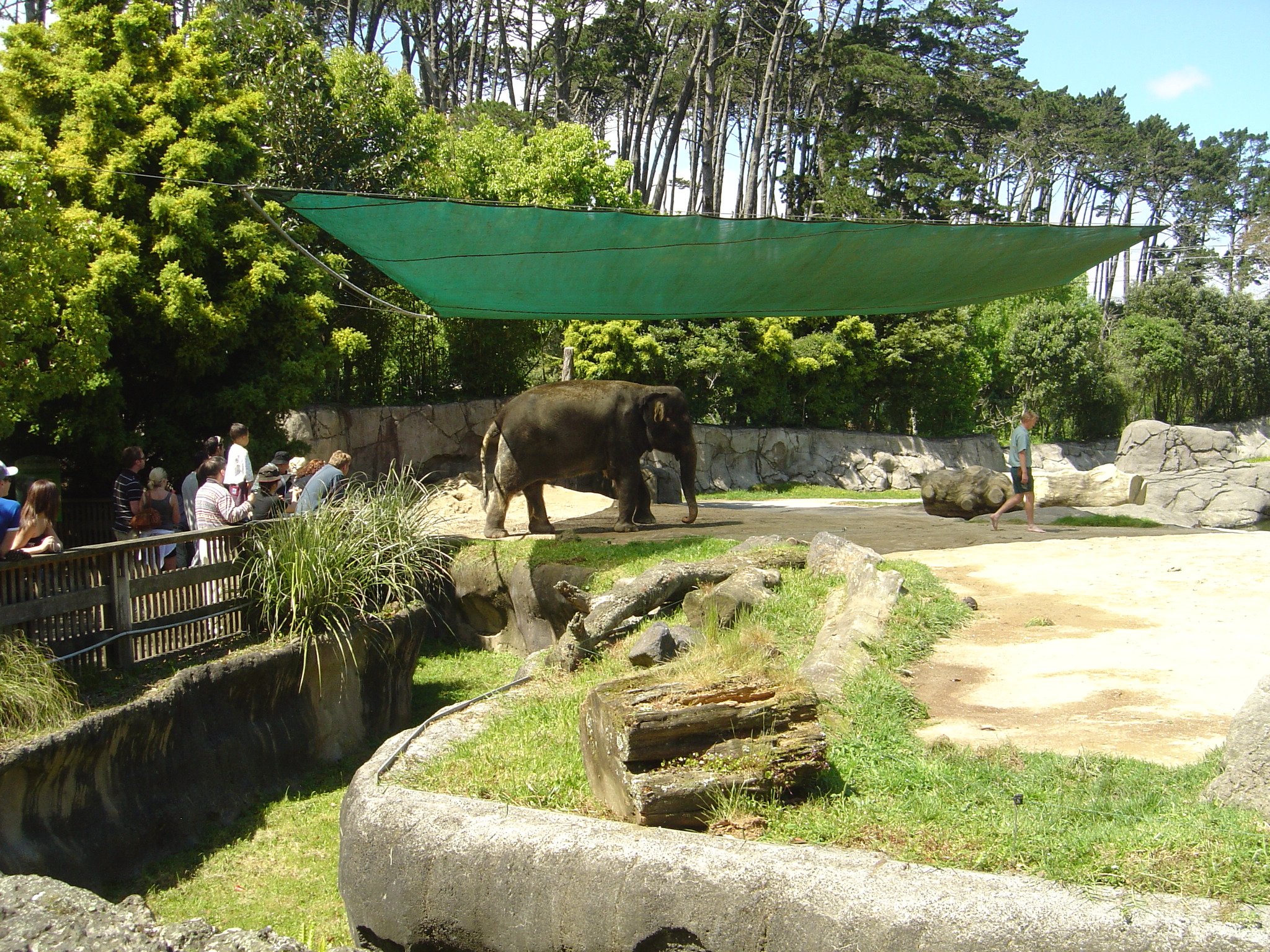
- Kashin in October 2007
- Species: Asian elephant
- Sex: Female
- Born: November 1968
- Died: 24 August 2009 (aged 40)
- Nationality: United States
- Owner: Auckland Zoo
- Named after: ASB piggy bank; "compassionate" in Hindi

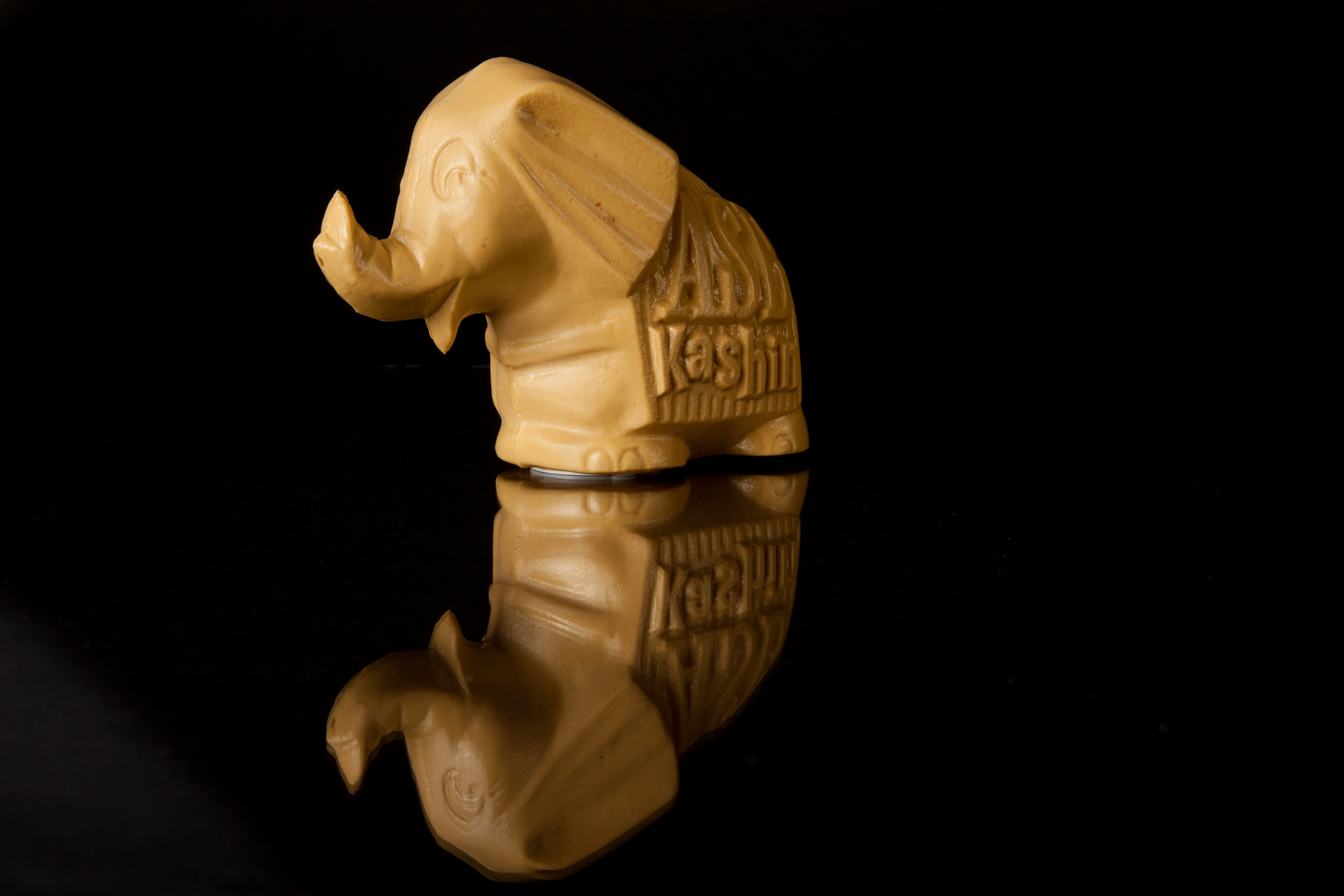
Kashin the elephant moneybox an incentive from ASB bank. "Put some cash in Kashin."

Kashin (November 1968 – 24 August 2009) was an Asian elephant who spent most of her life at Auckland Zoo in Auckland, New Zealand. She arrived from Como Zoo in the United States in 1973 and remained at Auckland Zoo until her death.

ASB Bank brought Kashin to the zoo in 1973 and she is a mascot of the bank. Her name means "cash-in", which came from a competition to come up with a name for the elephant-shaped piggy banks the bank sent to primary schools. She featured in the New Zealand produced television programme The Zoo.

She was euthanised on 24 August 2009 due to chronic arthritis and foot abscesses.

== See also ==
- List of individual elephants
- Burma (elephant)
