= Burma (elephant) =

Individual elephant (born 1982)

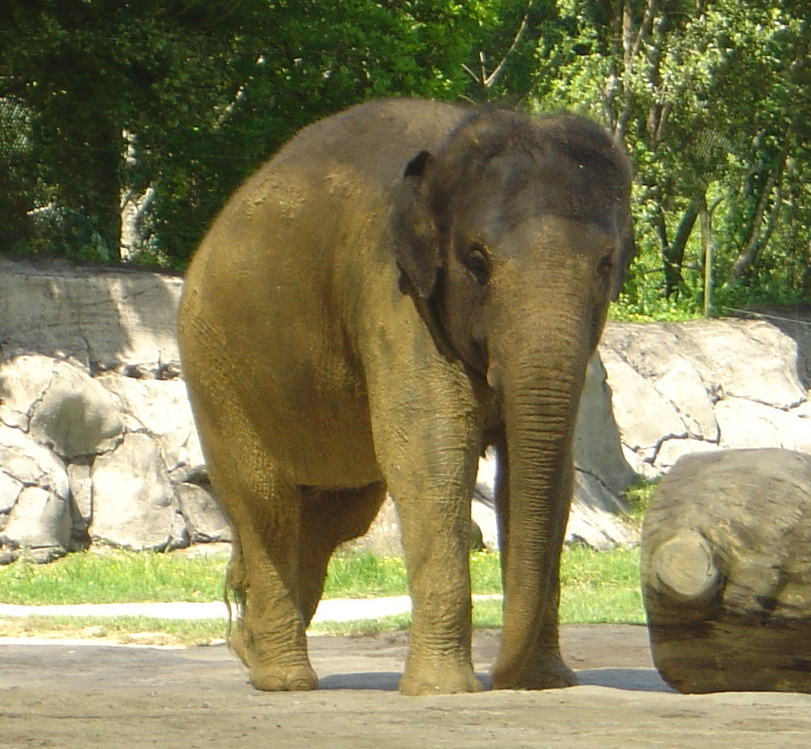
- Burma in 2007
- Sex: Female
- Born: October 1982; Burma (now Myanmar)
- Residence: Monarto Safari Park

Burma (born October 1982) is an Asian elephant at Monarto Safari Park in South Australia. Born in Myanmar (then known as Burma), she lived in New Zealand's Auckland Zoo from 1990 to 2024. Another elephant, Kashin, accompanied her until 2009, when Kashin was euthanised. Burma was the only elephant in her enclosure until 2015, when the zoo added a female elephant named Anjalee to the enclosure. The zoo announced in 2020 that they would end their elephant programme and sent Burma to South Australia in 2024.

== Early life ==
Burma, an Asian elephant, was born in October 1982 in Myanmar (then known as Burma). Before being moved to Auckland Zoo, she lived at a logging camp.

== Auckland Zoo ==
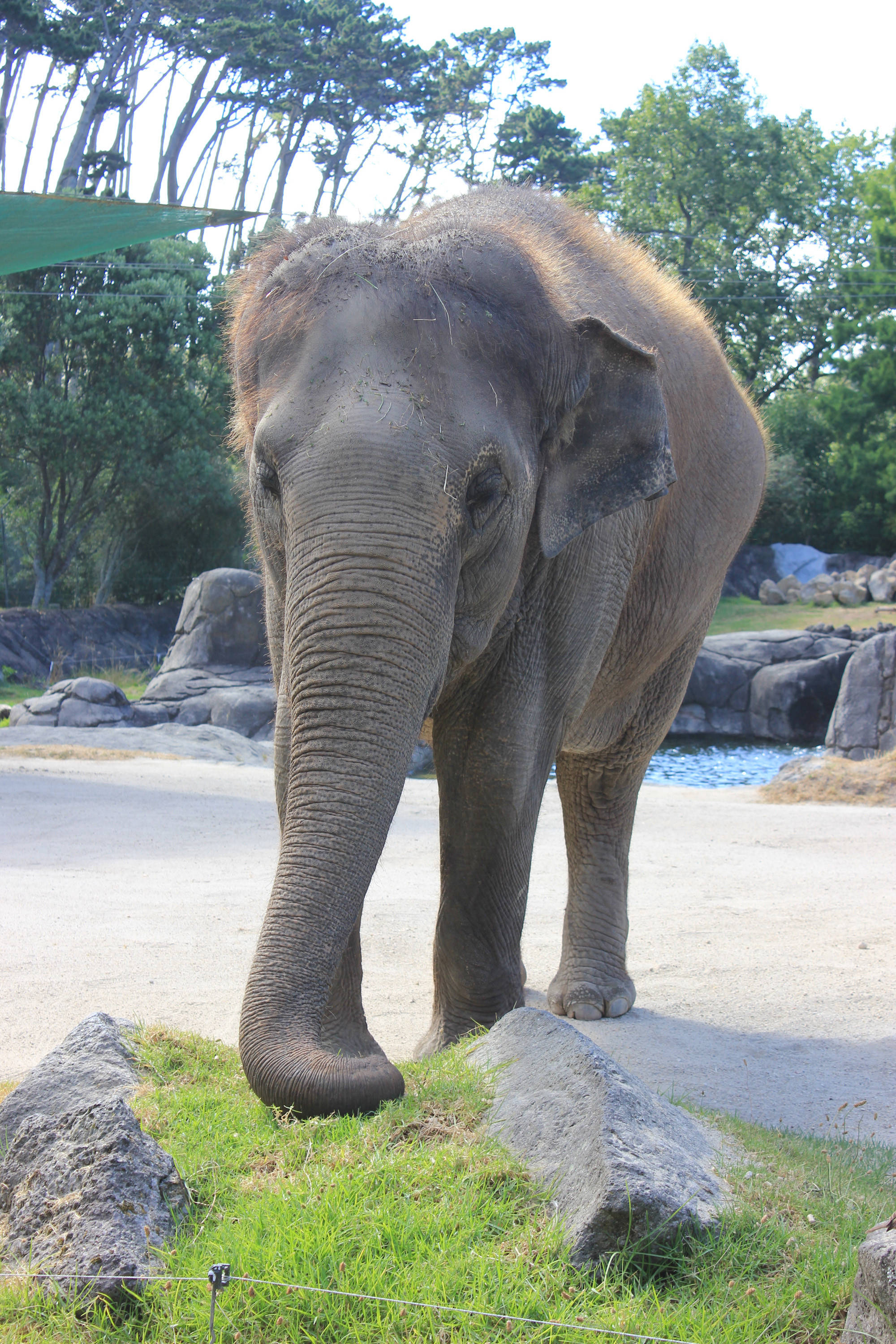
Burma in 2015

Burma came to Auckland Zoo in 1990. She initially exhibited "teenage high jinks" with which Kashin, the other elephant in the enclosure, was reported to be impatient. As she got older, these disappeared and the two elephants got along better. Burma was trained to perform actions after being spoken to in Hindi. Hindi was chosen over English in order to prevent her from unintentionally carrying out potentially dangerous commands.

In January 2004, Burma escaped the zoo after dropping a log in her enclosure onto an electric fence, which turned it off. She then went into a moat and "crashed through" the gate of the enclosure's outer fence, allowing her to wander around Western Springs Reserve. She was walked back into the zoo within about an hour. As a precaution, nearby roads and on-ramps to a nearby motorway were closed.

In 2008, it was reported that there was "talk of finding a sperm donor for Burma". After the elephant Kashin was euthanised in 2009, Burma became the only elephant at Auckland Zoo. Elephants are social animals that require company, so in 2011 the zoo put a horse, named Cherry, in Burma's enclosure due to concerns about her psychological health. That year, it was reported that there were no signs that Burma was depressed.

The zoo announced in 2011 that it would bring in two elephants from Sri Lanka to build an elephant herd with Burma as its matriarch. One of the elephants never came due to being "caught in court action", and the other one, Anjalee, arrived in 2015 after many delays. The zoo made five attempts at artificially inseminating Anjalee, which all failed. Other methods were considered, but the zoo never got Anjalee pregnant.

Auckland Zoo announced in 2020 that they would be ending their elephant programme and move the elephants out of the zoo. Anjalee was moved to Australia in 2022, which left Burma alone. Burma was set to move to Australia Zoo in 2022, but Australia Zoo suddenly cancelled the move a week beforehand due to concerns about the health of their elephant Megawati. Auckland Zoo said that it was "extremely disappointing" after having planned to move Burma to Australia Zoo for 12 months. She was moved to Monarto Safari Park in South Australia in 2024. She was the last elephant in New Zealand, and was described by 1News in 2024 as Auckland Zoo's "star attraction".

== Monarto Safari Park ==
Burma arrived at Monarto Safari Park in November 2024. She was given a police escort from Adelaide Airport to the park and was kept in quarantine for a month. She is the first of five elephants that will be housed in a 12-hectare site at the park, and was the first elephant to live in South Australia for 30 years. This group of elephants, drawn from the Auckland Zoo, Perth Zoo, and Taronga Zoo in Sydney, was gathered as part of a new regional breeding programme.

== See also ==
- List of individual elephants
