= Auckland Zoo =

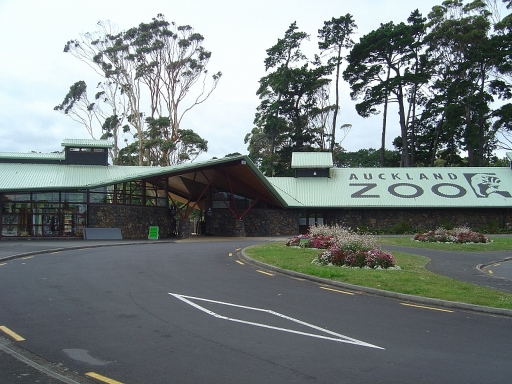
- Zoo entrance on Motions Road
- Interactive map of Auckland Zoo
- 36°51′46″S 174°43′15″E
- Date opened: 16 December 1922; 103 years ago
- Location: Western Springs, Auckland, New Zealand
- Land area: 16.35 ha (40 acres)
- No. of animals: 1,400+
- No. of species: 135
- Annual visitors: 716,327 (Jul 2012 – Jun 2013)
- Major exhibits: Africa, Australia, Sri Lanka, South America, Te Wao Nui, KidZone
- Owner: Auckland Unlimited, Auckland Council (indirectly through Auckland Unlimited)
- Website: www.aucklandzoo.co.nz

Auckland Zoo (99 Motions road) (Māori: Te Whare Kararehe o Tāmaki Makaurau) is a 16.35-hectare (40-acre) not-for-profit wildlife conservation organisation that focuses on the wellbeing of people, wildlife and nature.

The zoo is located in Auckland, New Zealand, specificly next to Te Waiōrea Western Springs Park. It is part of Tātaki Auckland Unlimited (an Auckland Council-controlled organisation).

Auckland Zoo opened in 1922 and by 1930 a sizeable collection of animals arrived and a zoological society formed. The zoo consolidated during the Second World War and was at that time under the leadership of Lt. Col. Sawer. After the war the collection was expanded. In 1956, chimpanzees from London Zoo arrived to take part in popular 'tea parties' for the public's entertainment - which was part of a global trend in zoos at the time. Due to changing attitudes and an evolving zoo philosophy, this practice ceased in 1963. In 1973 the zoo expanded into the adjacent Te Waiōrea Western Springs Park. From the late 1980s to the present day, many old exhibits were phased out and replaced by modern enclosures. In 2011 the zoo opened its largest development, Te Wao Nui, which is home to a host of native New Zealand flora and fauna.

The zoo has five separate tracks which are loosely separated into areas defined by the region of origin of the species exhibited, its taxonomy, or by biome. Zoo staff are active in conservation fieldwork (in New Zealand, French Polynesia and the Pacific Islands), which includes species monitoring, research and education. The New Zealand Centre for Conservation Medicine (NZCCM) houses the Auckland Zoo veterinary hospital, where sick and injured wildlife from around New Zealand are treated with the aim to be rehabilitated and released.

Auckland Zoo is a full institutional member of the Zoo and Aquarium Association (ZAA), and received ISO 14001 accreditation for its Environmental Management System in 2007. It is also part of the World Association of Zoos and Aquaria (WAZA) and the European Association of Zoos and Aquaria (EAZA).

Auckland Zoo is certified net carbonzero and Qualmark accredited EnviroGold.

== History and major events ==
Boyd's Animals – This newspaper article was in "The Auckland Weekly News" and is from June 1922, it reads: Wanted – A zoo for Auckland: some of the animals, formerly housed at Onehunga, which are to be destroyed unless the city agrees to purchase them.

Early history

In February 1911, businessman J.J. Boyd purchased 6 acres in Symonds Street, Onehunga for the purpose of establishing Auckland's first zoological facility. Boyd had established an earlier zoo in 1910 at Upper Aramoho near Wanganui (in the southern part of New Zealand's North Island).

Boyd's Onehunga Zoo was a constant source of aggravation for the local council. Local residents would complain regularly about the sounds and smells, and the council made regular attempts to close it during the following years. This prompted a successful run for mayor of Onehunga by Boyd.

Finally a change Onehunga Borough Council's by-laws forced Boyd to close the zoo in 1922. Auckland City Council used £800 to purchase the remaining animals that Boyd had not already sold to other individuals, as the basis for a group that would form the nucleus of the permanent zoo at Auckland's Western Springs. There is still a Boyd Avenue in Royal Oak today.

1920s

On the afternoon of Saturday 16 December 1922, the zoo was opened by the Governor-General, Admiral Jellicoe, with the mayor of Auckland James Gunson in attendance to a sizeable crowd. At this time Western Springs was 4 mi (6.4 km) from the town hall in what was then a semi-rural area. The story of Boyd's zoo was well publicised and the public warmed to the zoo immediately.

The early zoo was a bleak and uninspiring place, founded with an initial fund of £10,000. However, in 1923, the staff quickly set about planting 5,000 trees and developing the grounds into a pleasant setting.

The council had a meeting on 26 July 1923 with the purpose of arranging the location of a flying aviary, a monkey house and accommodation for the polar bears, bison and birds of prey. Money was also spent developing a bandstand, hippopotamus pools, elephant house and walk, refreshment kiosk and a tiger arena.

L.T. Griffin was the zoo's first supervisor, and in effect its first director. He went to Africa in 1923 to acquire species for the newly formed zoo. What followed was an aggressive policy of expansion over the next few years, including the zoo's first animal star, the female Indian elephant, Jamuna, whose influence is still seen today in the naming of Jamuna plaza in the rear of the modern zoo. The zoo originally had two keepers who worked seven-day weeks. The early mortality rate of animals in the zoo was terrible especially considering modern standards. However, this was normal for the time.

In 1927, the zoo was still expanding rapidly. By December that year, there were 250 mammals of 80 species, more than 1000 birds of 130 species and 24 reptiles of 6 species. Total expenditure on the zoo amounted to £53,818. Mortality rates were still high and staff were struggling with a plague of rats but there was positive news as well. Some of the zoo's most popular enclosures were completed and people were still keen to donate animals. Perhaps most encouraging was that 25 mammals and 62 birds were born at the zoo in 1928. By the end of the 1920s, the zoo was well established and had assembled a large collection in a relatively short period of time.

On 17 July 1929, the formation of the Auckland Zoological Society was announced: its main purpose was to encourage scientific study.

1930s

The zoo's first male elephant arrived at the zoo in November 1930 from Hobart Zoo, Tasmania, Australia. Rajah stood eight feet three inches at the shoulder and was 13 years old. Rajah spent six years in Auckland before his keeper began to lose control of him and he was put down by the future director of the zoo, Lt. Col. Sawer. This was considered more humane than chaining up the elephant for the rest of his life. It transpired that Rajah's unpredictable nature was due to a lit cigarette being put up his trunk by a patron while still in Hobart, however there are no contemporary reports in the newspapers of the time to support this as sound evidence. Rajah's carcass is on display at the Auckland War Memorial Museum.

In 1931, the mortality rate dropped significantly due to improvements in accommodation and handling. L.T. Griffin, the original director, died in 1935 and his last report was an optimistic one. On the top of the list for a new director was Lt. Col. E. R. Sawer, one-time Director of Agriculture in Rhodesia (Zimbabwe). Already in his mid-fifties, Col. Sawer was an advocate for the newish notion that zoological parks were fundamentally about education, science and conservation. He was initially approached to report on the zoo, and the council was suitably impressed with his submission of six pages of closely typed analysis on where the zoo should be headed. This report not only showed his general approach but gave the fullest report on the zoo at the time.

Stock numbers were heavily reduced in 1935 and some species such as the apes, sea lions and camels had disappeared completely. The polar bears and South African animals were senile and aged. Sawer's report called for animals to be paired or the sharing of enclosures of animals in "mournful solitude". Sawer made sweeping changes, with the overwhelming feeling being that of order and co-ordination. Sawer was appointed curator on 1 April 1936. The mortality rate was now 10% compared with 29.5% for mammals and 40% for birds at London Zoo in 1934. The mortality rate was further demonstrated by the figures in 1937, when only 9% of animals died, compared to a full 35% of the animals in 1930. For the first time, in 1939 natural increase had overtaken mortality in mammals. Sometimes the Colonel's remedies were miraculously effective. A tiger suffering from a cancerous intestinal sarcoma was successfully treated with massive doses of rhubarb and laxative. Much of the improvement came from attention to diet and supplements by providing food with vitamins for deficiencies. This resulted in improved fertility and reduced disease, and previously barren animals began to breed, Sawer was also a gifted marketer and pushed for greater attendance and an aquarium similar to that which had greatly increased visitor numbers at the New York Zoo.

In February 1938, the first keeper to suffer an injury was W.A. (Bill) Hawke who was attacked by a bear and suffered a serious leg injury. After five weeks in the hospital he could not continue his keeping duties, but stayed at the zoo for a further thirty years as a gatekeeper.

This point is where Sawer is first seen to be at odds with the council. He called for a clear objective for the zoo, attention to education, relaxation of restrictions on importing animals, and an increased ability to exhibit native New Zealand birds. The end of the Depression and the subsequent economic recovery helped Sawer in the transformation of a group of emptying cages to a "full house of exhibits".

1939–1945

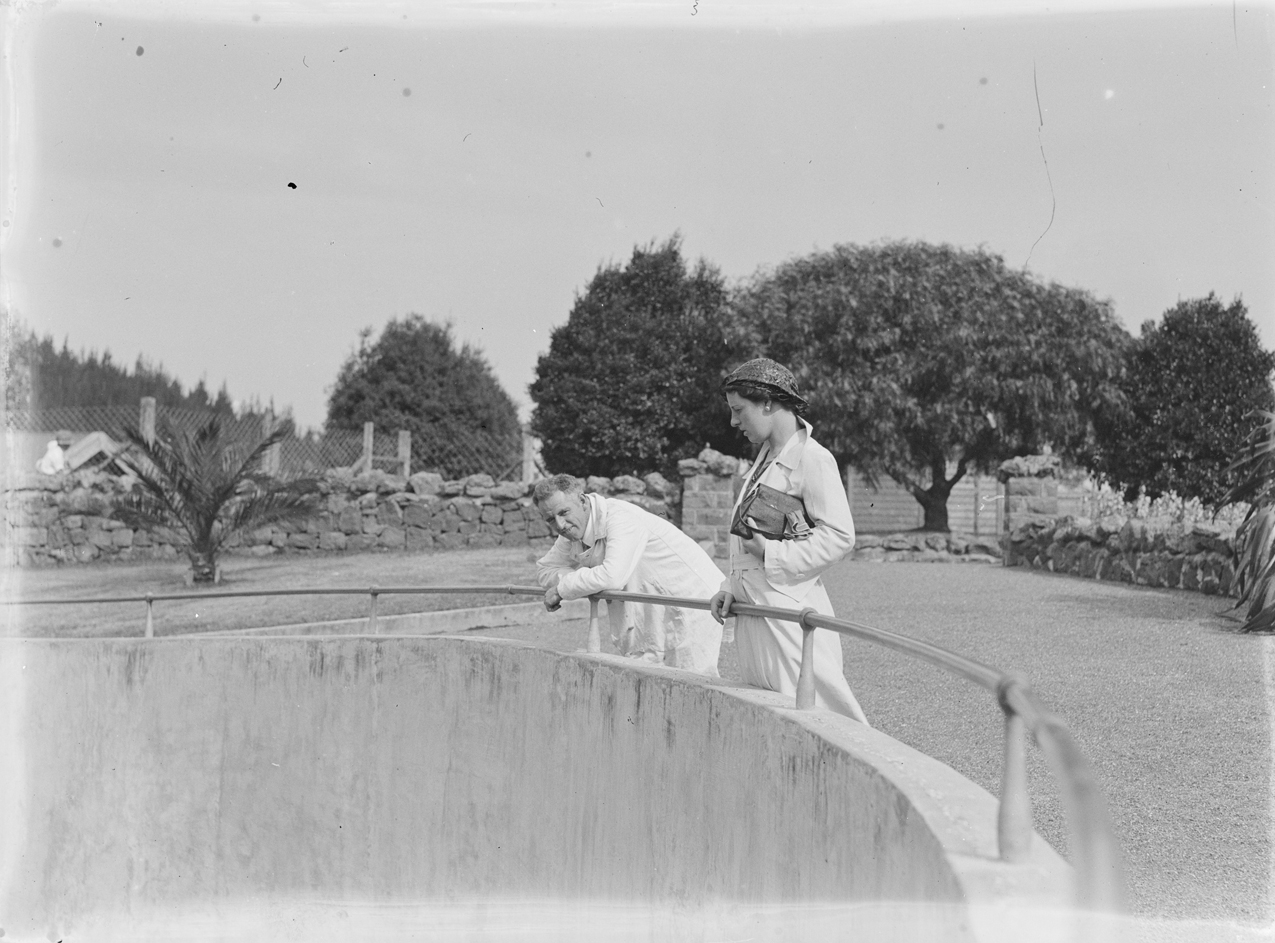
A man and woman standing beside the railing of an animal enclosure, c. 1940s.

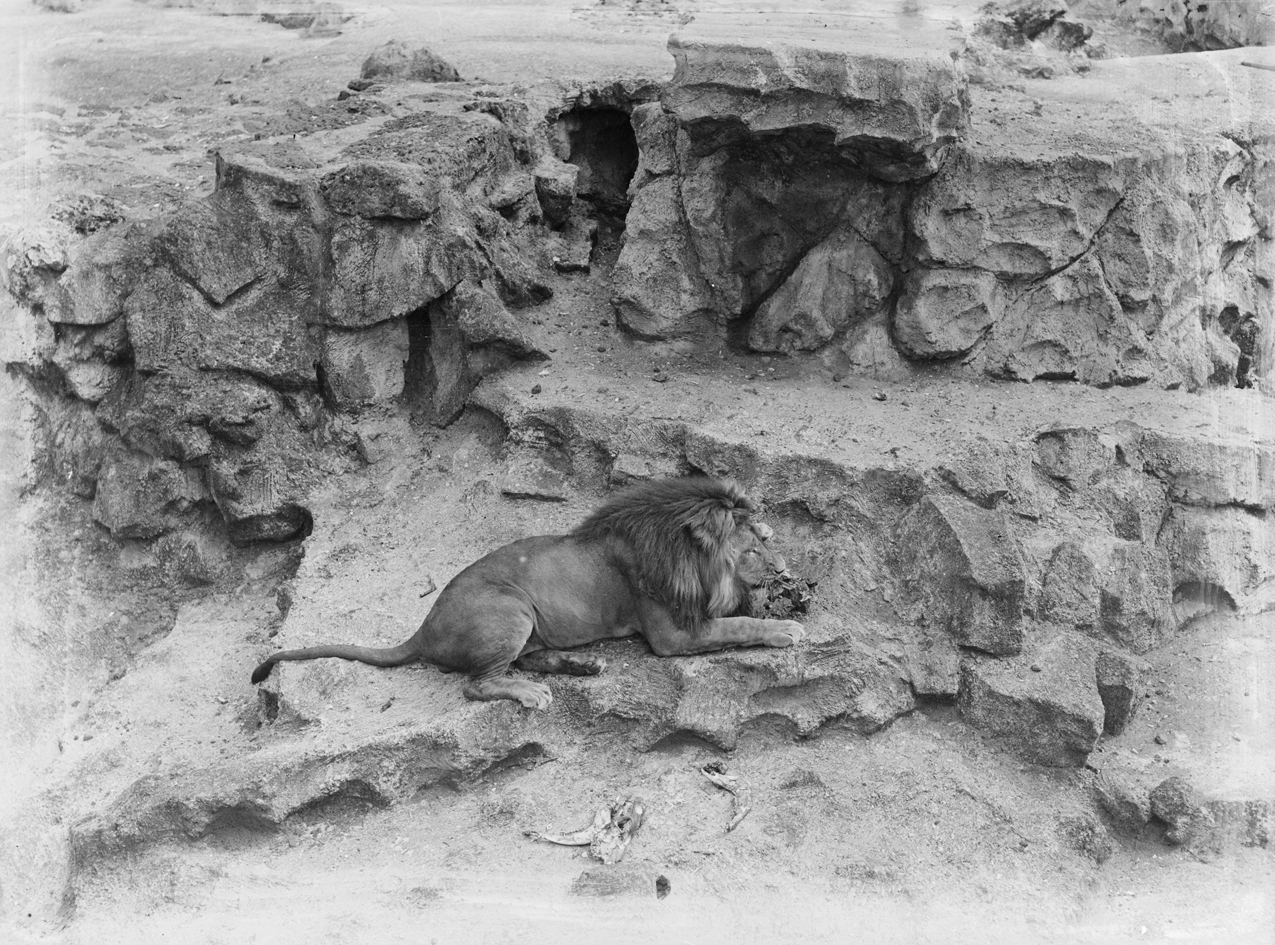
A reclining lion in a zoo enclosure, c. 1940s.

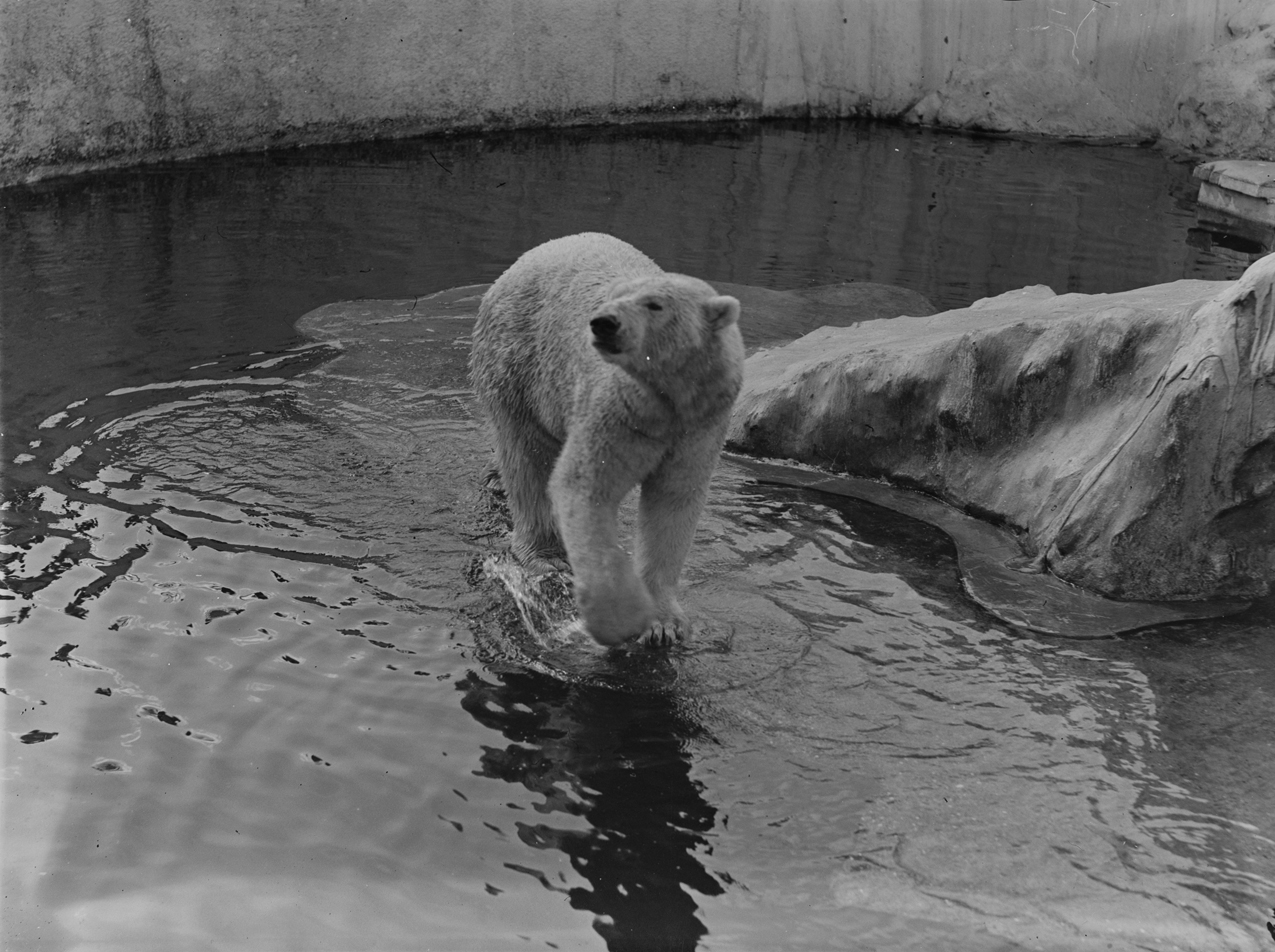
Polar bear splashing in water in an enclosure.

With the advent of World War II, the period 1939–45 saw the zoo simply trying to survive. Attendance was down, and animal importation and supplying zoo animals with food were low on the New Zealand Government's list of priorities. Due to these pressures, exhibits changed to more localised and rural representatives.

The arrival of United States military personnel in June 1942 helped the zoo, especially because the personnel were quartered close to Western Springs. It was not unusual for the majority of weekend visitors to be in uniform. The end of the war found the zoo in a state of slight disrepair and depletion of stock, but in good condition considering the conflict of the previous six years. This period also saw the retirement and movement away of many of the early or original members of the zoo staff.

1945–49

Auckland Zoo's problems did not evaporate with the end of the war. Zoos all over the world were looking to improve collections, and New Zealand's isolation was a deterrent to animal exporters. Additionally, Wellington Zoo was getting favouritism from politicians, and Auckland was still not allowed to exhibit native fauna.

The year 1948 was a turnaround point for the zoo, with new capital works being approved. In Sawer's March 1949 report, the details of the animals were given as 165 mammals in 51 species, 329 birds in 98 species and 19 reptiles in eight species. An aquarium was built, on a smaller scale than Sawer had anticipated, but successful nevertheless. The zoo had also finally won the right to exhibit kiwi, partly due to New Zealand soldiers becoming known as Kiwis during the war. A curator's house, offices and laboratory were constructed in 1949.

In late-1948, the council called for the first animal entertainments. Sawer strongly opposed this, but he was now approaching seventy years of age and his career was drawing to an end. Sawer recommended a full-time on-site curator and veterinarian and started to look for a successor.

"Sawer's retirement marked the end of a remarkable era. Despite considerable adversity, the Colonel had managed to keep the zoo operational and in better condition than anyone could reasonably have expected. But if Sawer had seemed ahead of his time in wanting the zoo to be seen primarily as an educational institution, the council had other priorities". The change of curators plunged the zoo into pursuit of the animal entertainments Sawer had so strenuously resisted.

1950s

Robert W. Roach, 36, an English veterinarian, took over as curator of the zoo in November 1949, with Sawer staying on as assistant curator until July 1950. Sawer died only nine months later aged 71, having lived in or around the zoo for the last fifteen years of his life. Roach introduced a process of regularly opening new exhibits and postcards to the zoo. The next five years saw a commitment to increased expenditure by the council with improvements to existing or new enclosures for sun bears, wombats, echidnas, monkeys, tigers and birds.

Tragedy stuck the zoo twice in 1954, first with the death of Albert Barnett the zoo foreman. Barnett died after a finger became infected in what was initially thought to be a minor injury sustained at work. In August, 65-year-old Frank Lane, who like Barnett had worked at the zoo since its opening, was killed in a much publicised accident. Lane had just fed a young elephant, Kassala, and was climbing back through the rails between the stalls when Jamuna swung her trunk, knocking him into the wall and killing him instantly. Barnett had been Jamuna's regular keeper and it was reported that she was upset after his death. It is believed Lane's death was the result of a tragic accident rather than a deliberate attack. Jamuna spent the rest of her life without incident.

In 1955, the council called for the zoo to obtain chimpanzees for performing shows. The zoo was adding new attractions, a miniature train, and in September two popular orangutans, Topsy and Turvey arrived. Four young performing chimpanzees arrived from Regent's Park Zoo in October and work was speedily completed on the construction of a chimpanzee performing area. The four chimpanzees were named Jane, Josie, Minnie and Bobby. They were joined by four more chimpanzees, Nick, Sissy, Charlie and Little Jane, in 1959.

In June 1957, the zoo found itself on the verge of a special event with the birth of twin polar bear cubs. Although one of the cubs died shortly after birth, the surviving cub, Piwi, was in good health. However, the cub was drowned at eleven weeks old when its mother was giving it swimming lessons. It is believed she held her cub too low on her chest. A stunned crowd watched as Piwi died.

Roach resigned in 1958, taking up a position in Kenya. During his time as Director, the enclosures in the zoo had been advanced and basic hospital facilities, a quarantine area, better equipment, and service areas had been created. Roach made many recommendations for the zoo, most notably the expansion into Western Springs Park. The next two years saw the opening of a children's zoo.

1960s

In August 1960, Derek Wood from Chester Zoo was appointed as zoo supervisor. Wood brought with him a male giraffe named John from England's Regent's Park Zoo to establish a new herd. Wood's first report in 1961 was positive and called for pairing of animals, improvements to accommodations, and a nocturnal house for New Zealand's national icon the kiwi. 310,500 people visited the zoo in this year. Also in 1961 a female elephant, Malini, arrived from Singapore, she was a long-awaited companion for Jamuna. Public feeding continued at the zoo and the perennial problems with rats, eels and flooding was still ongoing, there was pressure on the facilities and ablutions, many were still the originals from opening and the first serious calls for expansion began.

A second group of four tea party chimpanzees had arrived in 1959 and by February 1963 the council conceded that the tea parties had become unsafe to continue. However, they had become established, popular, and profitable, and Wood was instructed by the council to investigate importing additional chimpanzees. Change in British legislation and the New Zealand Customs Department blocking of an import permit finally ending the parties with the final one taking place in May 1964. These chimpanzee displayed abnormal, anti-social behaviour for the rest of their lives.

Nick died in 1961, followed by Minnie in 1964. The following month, Josie gave birth to an infant which died a few weeks later. Sissy also gave birth that year to a female named Suzie, who was hand-raised by keepers. Sissy gave birth to Suzie's younger sister, Sally, in 1970. Suzie and Sally did not participate in the tea-parties and were later successfully introduced into a group of mother raised chimpanzee to form a natural social group.

The tea party chimps remained at the zoo until their deaths as they were unable to be introduced to the wild group in the 1980s. Charlie died in 1971, Sissy in 1980 and Little Jane in 1987. After Josie died in 1999 and Bobby in 2004, Janie, remained alone, until her death on 11 October 2013, aged 60.

During 1962-63, a mysterious skin ailment afflicted the polar bears and would not respond to treatment. Two adult males, Natuk and Brunus and an adult female Natasha had to be euthanised. Natasha was the mother of the only cub to survive to adulthood in the seventy years Auckland Zoo exhibited polar bears. His name was Chimo and he was born in the early-1960s. This period also saw the arrival of many new animals, including a pregnant zebra, a female giraffe Anita, a pair of Bengal tigers, two young polar bears, a giant anteater, two capuchin monkeys, and four spider monkeys. The giraffe herd and spider monkey troop at the zoo today are descended from these imports.

Improvement of the buildings, exhibits and processes of the zoo were showing results, with old cages and aviaries demolished and new gardens planted. However, the most important undertaking was the formulation of a 25-year plan by the Council including an expansion into Western Springs park and a move to natural, moated, barless enclosures.

In September 1965, the zoo's star elephant Jamuna died. She was believed to be approximately fifty years old and had carried over 750,000 guests. Less than a year later, in May 1966, a visitor to the zoo decided to climb a safety barrier and the orangutan, Turvey grabbed him through a bar; biting him. The man received only minor wounds thanks to the intervention of a keeper who happened to be passing by.

The following year included a great number of new animal arrivals again. Including Indian antelope, white-tailed deer and Barbary sheep from Taronga Zoo, 23 keas from the South Island (two of which went to Dallas Zoo for three armadillos), 20 Australian lizards and two black leopard cubs. In April 1968, Ma Schwe, a female elephant came as a replacement for Jamuna.

The end of the 1960s saw a long-term plan for where the zoo's administration, collection and grounds were headed. The zoo's original entrance on Old Mill Road (which had been in use since 1922) was closed with a side entrance opening on Motions Road.

1970s

The early-1970s brought an improvement to the grounds, exhibits and animal husbandry. Improvement in veterinarian practices and equipment, stopping of public feeding (1979) and more naturalistic enclosures lead to healthier, happier animals and subsequently breeding success increased.

Animals deemed unsuitable for Auckland were transferred or phased out (not actively bred) of the zoo's collection. Behavioural enrichments were first provided during this time.

The NZI Kiwi Nocturnal House was opened in May 1971 and was the first of its kind in New Zealand. It still exists today as BNZ Kiwi and Tuatara House. Expansion finally was approved in August with an extra 12 acres (4.9 ha) into Western Springs to be developed, work began in 1973. Kashin, a female Indian elephant arrived from Como Zoo in the US the same year (was still at the zoo in the Animal Planet Elephant Clearing until her death in 2009). Two years later the first full-time teacher at the zoo was employed.

A proposal for a rural or open range zoo was put forward for the housing and breeding of larger mammals. The proposal has been brought up periodically but never realised. Also in 1976 the first comprehensive course for keepers started at the Auckland Technical Institute.

The late-1970s included more developments at the zoo than any previous time. A new gift shop, cafeteria and enclosures for the giraffe, zebra and antelope were completed. Animal diets were being refined to today's standard when quality and varied ingredients are purchased and meals detailed to individual species. White rhinoceros and tamarins arrived for the first time.

1980s

A new hippo enclosure, the availability of animal "adoption" and transfer of zoo marketing to a professional organisation marked 1980.

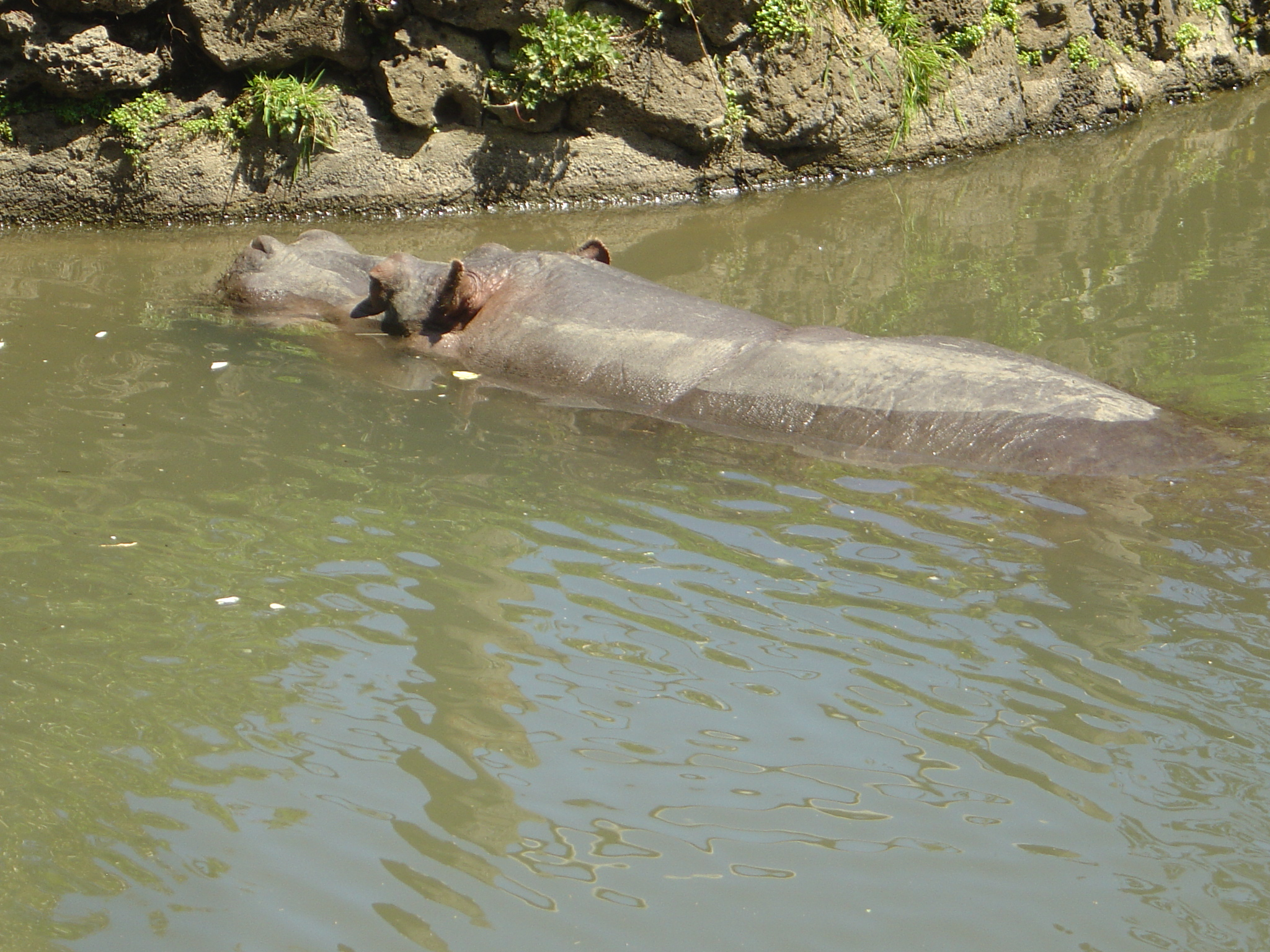
Auckland Zoo's elderly female hippopotamus Snorkel, who has since died, in Auckland Zoo's former hippopotamus exhibit.

The following year the zoo's entrance was moved to its current location (since renovated) in a carpark off Motions Road and the construction began on an improved animal hospital (completed in 1986 and since replaced by NZCCM). Fireworks in nearby Western Springs park were banned due to a giraffe, Lo Cecil's death. A year later the elephant, Ma Schwe died suddenly due to acute heart failure.

A larger Aquarium opened in 1982. However, visitor numbers started to show a decline, partly due to the opening of the Rainbow's End theme park and Kelly Tarlton's Underwater World in the Auckland area. The aquarium was closed in December 2007.

In the mid-1980s, a pair of chimpanzees, Mike and Lucy arrived from Taronga Zoo and formed a group with Auckland's youngest chimps, Suzie and Sally. They moved into the old timber wolf exhibit, which was renovated to accommodate chimpanzees. Mike and Lucy went on to have two offspring, Lucifer in 1988 and Luka in 1993. This group of six apes remained at the zoo until 2004.

In January 1987, the new orangutan exhibit opened (currently part of the zoo's Orangutan Trail), which now holds one of the zoo's two present Bornean orangutan groups, and zoo visitors began to rise again. At the time, it was the zoo's most impressive and costly ever exhibit designed to be moated and barless. However, a much more spectacular short-term exhibit was being investigated.

In 1981, three giraffes arrived from Honolulu Zoo, males Tsavo and Lo Cecil and female Kinshasa. Another female, Manyara, followed in 1983. Kinshasa gave birth to her first calf, Kiri, in 1984, followed by a second, Kay, in 1986. She had four more calves between 1988-92, none of which survived.

In 1986, the Chinese Government offered Australian Prime Minister Hawke a pair of giant pandas on loan for Australia's bi-centenary celebrations. They organised a three-month stay in Melbourne Zoo and a three-month stay in Taronga Zoo, Sydney. Auckland Zoo quickly investigated the feasibility of a third stop in Auckland. The Council agreed the two pandas should have every facility for their well-being and an enclosure was quickly built (which currently holds the second group of orangutan). The giant pandas arrived at the zoo in October 1988, a four-year-old male, Xiao Xiao and a three-year-old female Fei Fei for a popular three months. Over 300,000 saw the giant pandas during their stay in New Zealand.

In March 1989, the first orangutan in New Zealand was born, a female named Intan to eight-year-old mother, Indra. This birth was followed by a male, Datuk, in May 1989 to mother, Dara.

In December 1989, two California sea lion pups were born, a female named Sleek to mother, Sinka and a female named Kelp to mother, Kline.

1990s

The female Asian elephant Burma arrived in 1990 as an eight-year-old, with the Elephant Clearing exhibit beginning construction soon after. It is a large moated enclosure with a modern elephant house and pool, in which the animals can completely submerge.

In December 1991, two more California sea lion pups were born. Sinka gave birth to Scuttles, followed by Keel, born to Kline. Kline gave birth again in December 1993 to Kipper. In the mid-1990s, Sleek and Kelp were sent overseas, with their father, leaving the zoo with Scuttles, Sinka, Kline, Keel and Kipper. Scuttles and Kipper are still alive in 2014 and are now aged in their 20s.

In June 1994, Indra the orangutan gave birth to her second offspring, a male named Isim. Dara's six-year-old son, Datuk, left for Taronga Zoo in 1996.

The last polar bears, Joachim and Ingrid died in 1995 within a month of each other. The exhibit, which had been constructed in the 1920s, was demolished and the species phased out. Other species to be phased out of the zoo's collection in the 1990s included: the wombat, puma, jaguar and leopard.

In 1998, the zoo's lions, Ruby and Jade, moved out of the historic lion pit to make way for renovations. After extensive changes were made, including the addition of a pool, two-year-old Sumatran tiger siblings, Nisha and Malu, arrived from Wellington Zoo. Nisha was kept for breeding while Malu was sent to Perth Zoo in 1999 to be paired with their male tiger.

Pridelands opened in 1997, including the new savannah exhibit for the giraffe, springbok, zebra and ostrich, the rhino exhibit and Lion Hill. A year later, it was extended to include a new hippopotamus exhibit and a chacma baboon exhibit. Hippopotamus, Snorkel, Faith and Fudge, were lifted by crane to their new exhibit. After years of success in breeding, Auckland Zoo decided to phase out the hippopotamus species by sending their surplus male hippos overseas and castrating their remaining male hippo, Fudge, in 1993. Due to the average life expectancy of the hippopotamus averaging 45–50 years, it will be a long phase out, covering at least the first quarter of the 21st century. Snorkel died in 2010 while Faith (40) and Fudge (28) both died in 2017.

Male lions, Tonyi and Tombo, arrived from Philadelphia Zoo in 1998, followed by females, Kura and Sheeka in 1999 from the United States and Australia respectively. They took up residence in the newly developed Lion Hill.

In 1999, the zoo's current rhino, Mandala, was joined by ten-year-old male, Kruger; 13-year-old female, Mzithi; and 18-month-old female, Mbili. These three rhino had been imported from South Africa to strengthen the genetics of the Australasian population of southern white rhinoceros. It was discovered Mzithi, already a mother to 18-month-old Mbili, was 10 months pregnant upon arrival in New Zealand from South Africa.

=== 2000s ===
In April 2000, a ten-year-old Temminck's golden cat, Hari, arrived from Taronga Zoo. He was joined in January 2003 by a two-year-old female, Hoi-An, from Singapore Zoo. In March 2004, Hoi-An, gave birth to twin males, Datan and Hotan. Datan was sent to Hamilton Zoo in 2005 and following his death later that year, Hotan was sent as a replacement. Hoi-An gave birth again in January 2005 to a single male cub, Saigon. Stress caused Hoi-An to carry him in her mouth constantly, resulting in a wound to his neck. He was removed for hand-rearing and progressed well. Following Hari's death in 2006, a new pair, Kuching and Singha, arrived from the Adelaide Zoo in 2008.

In June 2000, white rhino, Mzithi, gave birth to the zoo's first white rhino calf, and the first female white rhino born in New Zealand. The calf was named "Kito", a Swahili name meaning "precious". Following the unexpected death of Mzithi and Mbili, in September 2003, the orphaned Kito was sent to Hamilton Zoo in January 2004 to learn socialisation skills from their herd. In 2007, white rhino Mandala was put down due to neurological health issues and Auckland Zoo participated in a rhino swap. Auckland's male, Kruger, was sent to Hamilton Zoo for breeding, while they received Hamilton's breeding male, Zambezi, and his sons, Inkosi and Mtoto.

In June 2000, Dara the orangutan gave birth to a daughter named Darli. Shortly after the birth, Dara contracted septicaemia and her condition worsened rapidly. Darli, weak from a lack of feeding, died at just a day old after Dara rolled on her. Despite the efforts of her keepers, Dara died the following day. In mid-2001, three female orangutans, Wanita, Melur and Gangsa, arrived from Taronga Zoo and were introduced to the Auckland Zoo group. Melur gave birth to a son, Madju, in November 2005. The father was Charlie. Horst, Indra and their daughter Intan departed for Busch Gardens, Tampa Bay, Florida in July 2009. Horst and Indra were two of the zoo's original group of Bornean orangutans which arrived during the early-1980s along with Dara and Charlie.

In November 2000, Asian small clawed otter Jaya, gave birth to three males pups, named Jala, Jari and Jandra. Her daughter, Jade, gave birth to five male pups in May 2001. All eight pups were fathered by breeding male Te'alc and were sent to other zoos upon reaching maturity. Te'alc was sent to Wellington Zoo in late-2001. Jade was then paired with the zoos older male, Nip. They had a litter in May 2002 consisting of male, Nadi and females Jana and Java. In April 2003, Jade gave birth to a litter of four females. Nadi was transferred to Wellington Zoo and following Nip's death, the zoo formed an all female group consisting of mother and daughter Jaya and Jade and Jade's six daughters. A new breeding male, Juno, arrived in 2008 from Adelaide Zoo and was paired with Jana. They produced twin male pups in July 2009 named Kanan and Banyu.

In December 2000, red panda, Maya, gave birth to female twins, Blaze and Amber. She gave birth again in December 2002 to triplets, Chico, Badal and Khorshuva. Blaze left for Mogo Zoo in 2002 and in 2006, brothers Chico and Badal were sent to Hamilton Zoo. The zoo's breeding male, Shimla, died in 2006, leaving the zoo with Maya and her daughters, Amber and Khorsuva.

In May 2001, siamang gibbon, Iuri gave birth to her fifth offspring, a male named Irian. In March 2003, she gave birth to twins, the first born in Australasia. The female infant, Iberani, was put down in May 2003 after her mother attacked her and rejected her and her twin brother, Iwani. Iwani was reintroduced to his family in June 2004. He later became the zoo's breeding male after Irian left for Adelaide Zoo in 2006 and his parents, Itam and Iuri left for Hamilton Zoo in 2009. He was paired with a female, Kera, who arrived from Mogo Zoo in October 2009.

In May 2001, three-year-old lioness, Kura, gave birth to four cubs, the first born at the zoo since the 1980s. The four females were named Amali (Hope), Amira (Princess), Kuchami (Go far) and Kutaza (Cross one). In August 2001, two-year-old Sheeka gave birth to three female cubs, named Djane, Djembe and Zhara. When the cubs reached a year old, Amali and Kutaza were transferred to Adelaide Zoo, Kuchami to Taronga Zoo, and Djane, Djembe and Zhara to Wellington Zoo. In April 2003, male lions Tonyi and Tombo left for Melbourne Zoo. New males Lazerus and Ngala arrived from South Africa to join lioness' Kura, Sheeka and Amira. Sheeka was sterilised to prevent further breeding but in March 2004, Amira gave birth to two cubs, a male, Zulu and a female, Zalika. In May 2004, Kura gave birth to males, Malik and Amani and females, Tiombe and Kibira. All six cubs were sired by Lazerus. In 2005, Zulu and Malik were sent to Wellington Zoo, Amani to Mogo Zoo and Zalika, Tiombe and Kibira to Monarto Zoo.

In July 2001, a flock of flamingo were imported from Flamingo Land, Slimbridge, in the UK. The chicks, all aged under three months, were incubated, hatched and handreared at the facility; before being flown to New Zealand when the youngest chick was 35 days old.

In September 2001, the Sea Lion and Penguin Shores opened. California sea lions, Scuttles, Keel and Kipper were moved across from the old sea lion pool while six little blue penguins took up residence in an adjacent exhibit within the complex. The sea lion pool is a filtered salt water tank with a circulating supply. It was designed to recreate a New Zealand Coastal ecosystem and cost $5 million to construct. It features an underwater viewing window and is over three times as deep as the old sea lion pool, built in the 1930s. In 2002, Auckland Zoo temporarily hosted female sea lions, Rosey and Cody from Marineland. They returned in 2003.

In September 2001, male serval Indlozi arrived from Germany to join females, Izazi and Mazimba, and in April 2002, Mazimba gave birth to the first serval to be born in Australasia in 10 years. The male kitten named Sika developed a benign growth on his neck at 8 weeks of age, but it was successfully removed and there was no further complication. Mazimba was sent to the National Zoo and Aquarium in Australia in 2003, while Sika was transferred to Mogo Zoo. He fathered a male kitten named Moholo, who is now Auckland Zoo's new breeding male. In 2003, a new female arrived from South Africa, named Shey. She gave birth to triplets in 2004, males Inkosi and Suda, and a female, Ngozi. In 2008, Izazi gave birth, but the kittens did not survive.

In November 2002, Kiri the giraffe gave birth to male calf named Masamba (Swahili for leaves). This was followed by a second male born to Kay in December 2002, named Jabari (Swahili for strong, brave). These were the first calves born in eight years and the first to new breeding male, Zabulu. A new female, Rukiaya, arrived from Wellington Zoo the same month. Kiri died less than six months after the birth of Masamba, following an injury to her leg. In 2004, Kay gave birth to her fourth calf, a male named Ndale. She gave birth to her fifth calf, Dume in 2006 and her sixth calf Ntombi in 2007. Ntombi was the first surviving female calf born in 21 years. Masamba, Jabari, Ndale and Dume were all sent to Hamilton Zoo to form a bachelor herd with their two giraffe, while Ntombi was sent to Western Plains Zoo. Rukiaya gave birth to her first calf in 2006, which died shortly after birth, and her second in 2007. The male calf, Forrest, was sent to Australia Zoo a year later.

In June 2004, the chimpanzee troop, Suzie, Sally, Mike, Lucy, Luka and Lucifer, were sent to Hamilton Zoo. The same year, Tea Party Chimp, Bobbie, died, leaving the zoo with Janie, then aged in her fifties.

In November 2005, a male New Zealand fur seal, Kaioko, arrives at Auckland Zoo, he is later joined by a female New Zealand fur seal, Moana, in June 2006 and a male Sub Antarctic fur seal, Orua, in August 2007.

In December 2005, zebra Shiloh gave birth to a male foal named Bakari, the first zebra born at the zoo since Shiloh's birth in 1992. A second mare, Itika, arrived in 2006 and gave birth to a male foal named Carlo in December 2007. The zoo's breeding male, Monty, died in November 2007 and was replaced by a stallion from Hamilton Zoo named Machono in 2008. Bakari and Carlo were sent to Keystone Wildlife Park the same year.

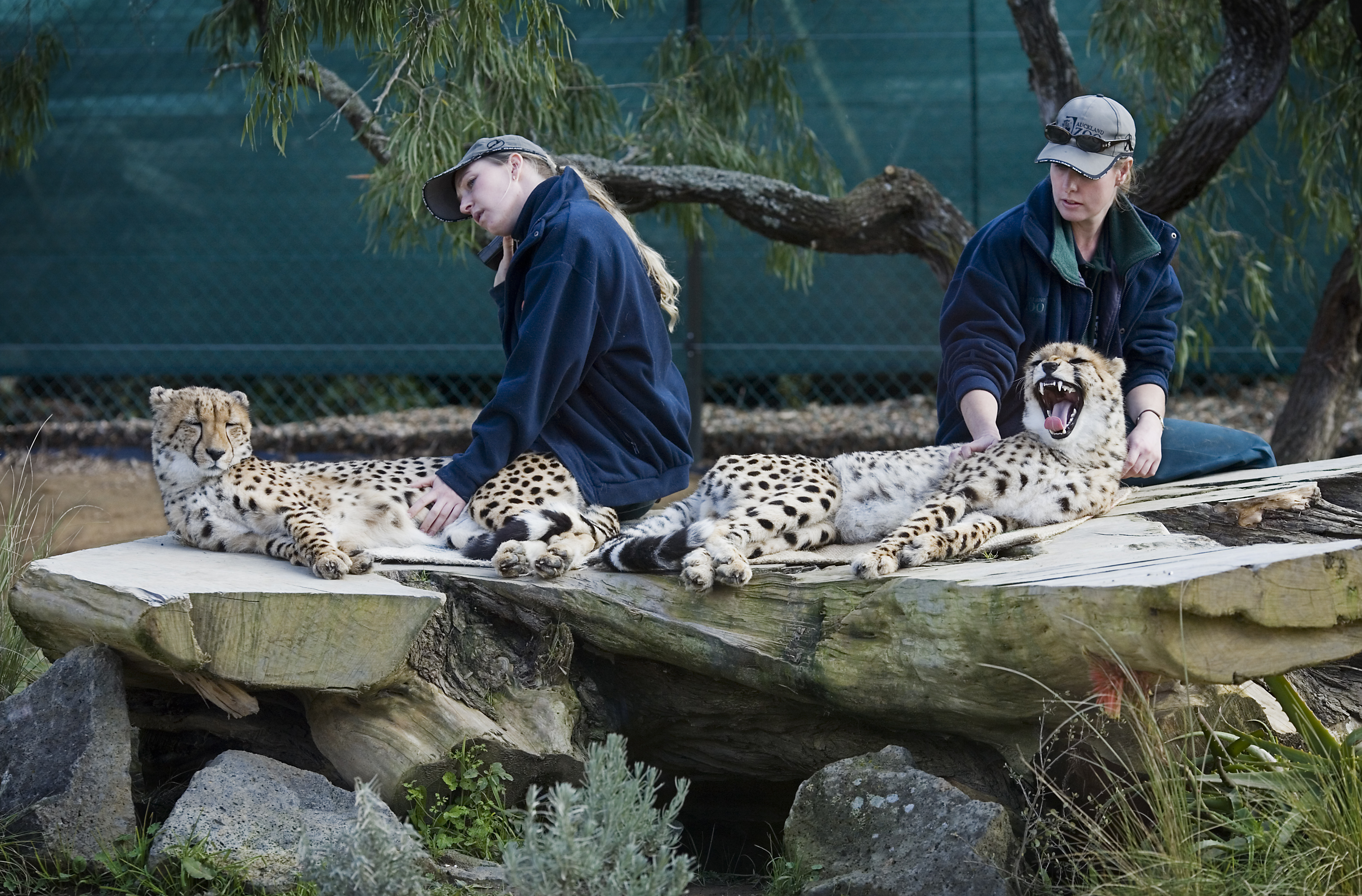
Two zookeepers with two cheetahs, 2006

In April 2006, cheetah brothers, Anubis and Osiris arrived from the Cheetah Outreach Centre in South Africa. Handraised since birth, they participate in visitor encounters and are walked daily around the zoo.

In September 2007, Auckland Zoo opened the New Zealand Centre for Conservation Medicine (NZCCM) - the first national centre for conservation medicine in the world - replacing the zoo's old vet centre. The NZCCM's public viewing gallery offers visitors clear views into the centre's laboratory, large treatment room and operating theatre.

In May 2006, sumatran tigress Nisha died following a stroke. A month later, her intended mate, two-year-old Oz, arrived from Tel Aviv Zoo. Nisha's sister, six-year-old Molek was imported from Hamilton Zoo in September and after mating with Oz, gave birth to triplets in June 2008. The two males, Jalur and Berani, and the female, Cinta, were the first sumatran tigers to be born at Auckland Zoo.

In February 2007, porcupine Diablo arrived and took up residence in the meerkat enclosure.

In January 2008, Auckland Zoo's first litter of meerkat pups were born to parents, Umi and Mbembe. Several more pups have been born since.

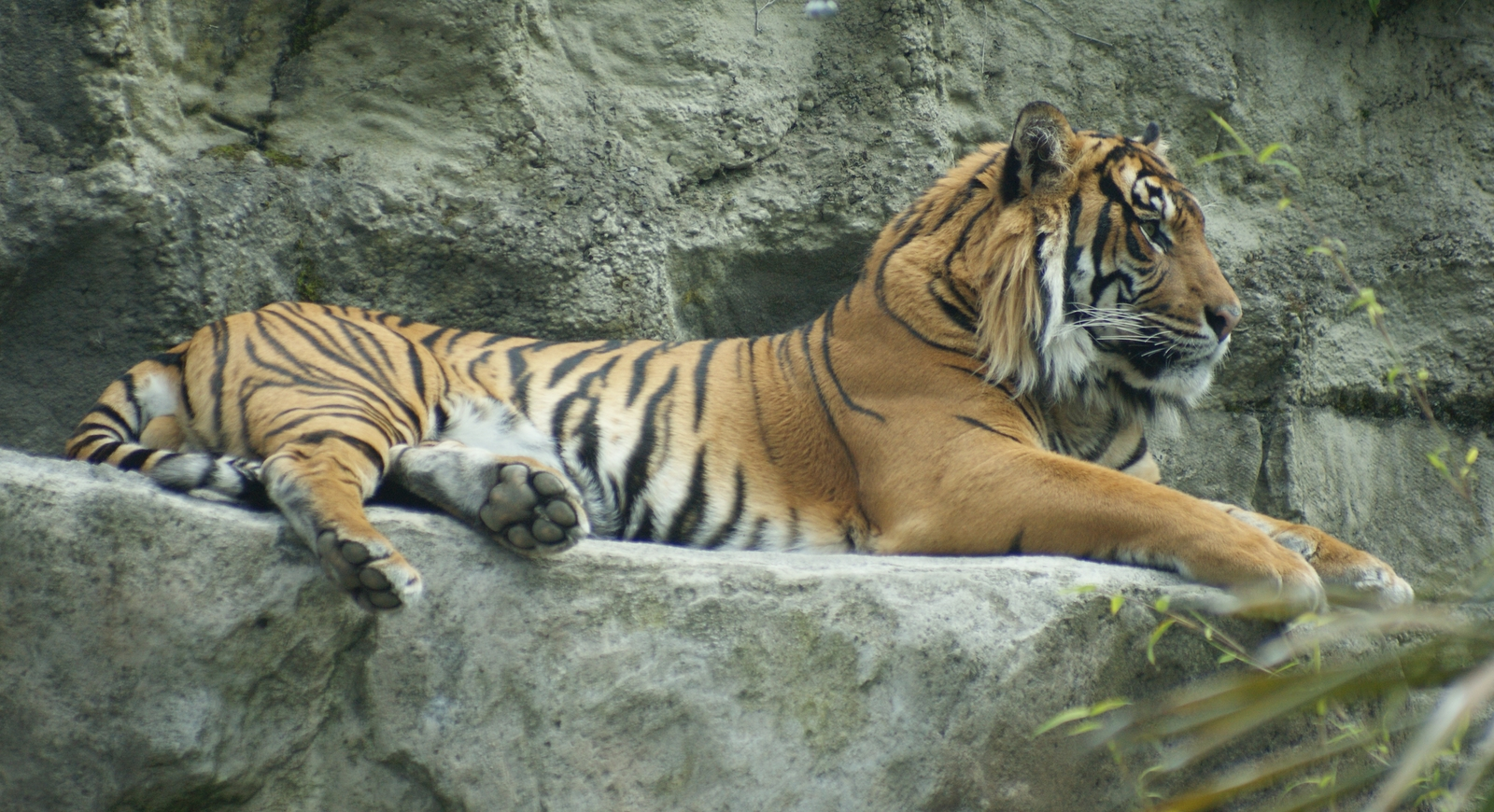
Tiger at the zoo, 2009

In May 2009, Auckland Zoo decided to phase out the chacma baboon subspecies and focus on the hamadryas baboon, which is housed in zoos throughout the region. Females, Kito and Ayisha, arrived from Wellington Zoo and in June 2009, males Afar and Wasaro, arrived from Adelaide Zoo Female, Ayisha, was pregnant on arrival from Wellington Zoo and gave birth to a son in July 2009 named Yafeu.

In August 2009, Kashin the zoo's 41-year-old elephant was put down following ongoing health issues related to her arthritis. Kashin arrived at Auckland Zoo in 1972 and was housed for many years in the old elephant house, before she and Burma moved to the Elephant Clearing in 1992. A record 18,000 people came to celebrate her life on Sunday 29 August - the most visitors ever to visit the zoo in one day.

=== 2010s ===
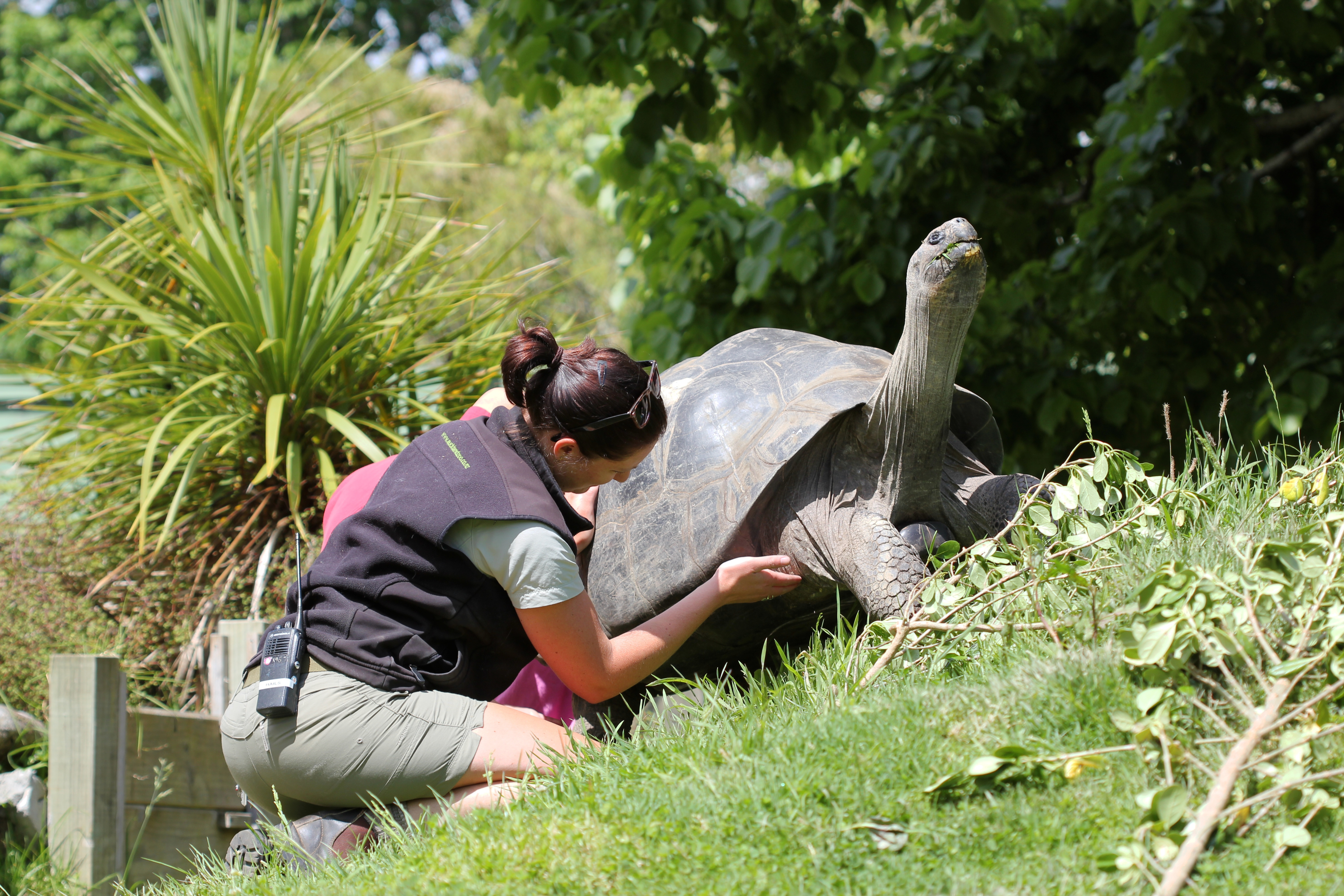
Zookeeper examining a Galapagos tortoise, 2010

In March 2010, giraffe Rukiya gave birth to her third calf, a son named Jelani. In December 2011, a new female is brought in from Taronga Zoo, named Kiraka. Rukiya's fourth calf, a daughter named Nakaru, was born in January 2012 and her fifth calf, a female named Shira in August 2013 Kiraka gave birth to her first calf, a female named Mdomo, in November 2013. In May 2014, a new giraffe house was completed to house the female giraffes overnight In April 2015 Rukiya had yet another daughter, Zuri (meaning beautiful in Swahili)

In April 2010, Temminck's golden cat, Singha, gave birth to a litter of kittens which died shortly after birth. In June 2010, the father, Kuching, was euthanased after being diagnosed with cancer and the decision was made to discontinue this species programme in Australasia, as Auckland and Hamilton were now the only institutions to hold golden cats.

In June 2010, Auckland Zoo opened the Tropics exhibit. The tropics precinct provided a new home for the zoo's American alligator, 26-year-old Doris, soon afterwards joined by four 8-year-old new females. In November 2010, male golden lion tamarin, Janeiro, arrived from Adelaide Zoo as a companion for the zoo's female, Gabrielle.

In August 2010, zebra Itika gives birth to a foal, Unyazi. Stallion Machano, was sent to Keystone Wildlife Park in 2012 and Carlo was returned to the zoo as the new breeding male. He was joined by a female named Shamwari in November 2012 In March 2013, Unyazi was sent to Taronga Zoo.

In September 2010, eight-year-old female red panda Khosuva, was sent to Darjeeling Zoo to participate in their breeding programme, Project Red Panda, which is aimed at breeding red panda for release into the wild. The intention is to release any offspring Khosuva produces into the wild once old enough for release. In return, Auckland Zoo received a 10-year-old male red panda named Sagar to be paired with their female, Amber. Breeding between Sagar and Amber was unsuccessful but a new female, Bo, arrived from Melbourne Zoo in July 2012. Bo gave birth to a male cub named Pabu (meaning puffball), in December 2012 and twins in January 2014

In October 2010, two-year-old Sumatran tigers, Jalur and Cinta, leave for Symbio Wildlife Park in Australia. Their sibling, Berani still lives at the zoo with his mother, Molek. In November 2013, Auckland Zoo sent their breeding male, Oz, to Hamilton Zoo to contribute to their breeding programme. They received Molek's brother, Jaka, in exchange.

In April 2011, Auckland Zoo's success with breeding hamadryas baboons continued when Ayisha gave birth to a son, Sekani. Kito gave birth to a daughter, Naeemeh in July 2011 and a son, Badi, in December 2012.

In September 2011, Auckland Zoo completed its largest project in the zoo's history, Te Wao Nui. Te Wao Nui covers over a 5th of the zoo grounds and is completely focused on showing visitors New Zealand's unique flora and fauna. There are 6 parts or habitats: The Coast, The Islands, The Wetlands, The Night, The Forest and The High Country.

In September 2012, dominant male lion Lazerus, leaves for Taronga Western Plains Zoo. The remaining male lion, Ngala, was euthanised on 15 August 2014, after suffering from a ruptured ligament. Auckland Zoo currently has three female lions, Kura, Sheeka and Amira and have no plans to import a male in the immediate future.

In October 2013, Janie the last remaining Tea-Party chimp, died at the age of 60, having lived at Auckland Zoo for 57 years.

In November 2013, a new male serval Moholo arrived from Mogo Zoo. In April 2014, he was joined by a one-year-old female serval named Shani, from Boise Zoo in the US.

In January 2014, two flamingo chicks were successfully hatched. It is the first time a zoo has successfully bred from an entirely hand-reared flock in the world, and the pair are the first ever bred in Australasia. One chick was euthanased in March 2014 after its health deteriorated but the surviving chick is in good health and brings the total flock number to 17.

In February 2014, Auckland Zoo announced the successful breeding and rearing of twin lesser short-tailed bats, a species endemic to New Zealand. The zoo was the first captive facility in the world to breed and raise this species to adulthood.

In March 2014, otters Juno and Jeta produced two male pups.

In April 2014, Auckland Zoo opened a new exhibit for four Tasmanian devils who arrived from Healesville Sanctuary in Australia. The devils are there as part of an insurance population for the species and to raise awareness about the plight of this critically endangered marsupial.

In June 2014, Auckland Zoo hosted world-renowned primatologist, Jane Goodall. She was introduced to some of the zoo's native animals, including kea, tuatara, weta and long finned eels.

In January 2015, siamang gibbon, Iwani was euthanased due to ongoing welfare issues. Iwani was handraised from the age of six weeks, after he was rejected by his mother, and was frequently agitated due to his inability to adjust to life as a siamang. He was paired with a female mate, Kera, but did not bond with her, and frequently sought human interaction by calling continuously at the viewing windows.

In April 2015, Auckland Zoo got two young female capybara (world's largest rodent) from Adelaide Zoo. Their names are Rosita and Consuela. They share an enclosure with the squirrel monkeys in The Rainforest exhibit.

In March 2015, Auckland Zoo first announced that 8-year-old Asian elephant Anjalee would be coming to the zoo from Sri Lanka halfway through the year to be a companion for lone elephant Burma. She has to spend a 3-month quarantine period on Niue before coming to Auckland. The zoo has been trying to look for an elephant companion for Burma since Kashin's death in August 2009.

In January 2016, the zoo celebrated the birth of two Nepalese red panda cubs, who are a very valuable addition to the international breeding programme for this endangered species. There was also a baby boom in the Rainforest, when three squirrel monkeys were born.

In February 2016, the zoo celebrated new additions to the breeding and rearing of New Zealand's rare and unique Archey's frog, the world's most evolutionarily distinct and globally endangered amphibian. Three Archey's frogs metamorphosed successfully in December 2013. These breeding successes, the first of their kind, have boosted the Zoo's Archey's frog population to 25.

In May 2016, giraffe Zuri, a one-year-old female, joined Wellington Zoo's two female giraffes in the African savannah.

In June 2016, two male capybara pups were born to Kosh, (a male who arrived from Chester Zoo late 2015) and mother Consuela. They were named Pepe and Pablo. The pups brought Auckland Zoo's capybara total up to five individuals, however there are no longer any capybaras at the zoo.

In September 2016, male rhino Mtoto was flown and then driven to Altina Wildlife Park south-west of Sydney. A purpose-built marine aluminium crate transported 1.7 tonne Mtoto, whose Trans-Tasman flight was a Qantas Boeing 767 Freighter.

In December 2016, Auckland Zoo's new $3.2million 'Strangely Beautiful Australia' development opened, which draws on the Murray-Darling region of Southeast Australia. The area is home to giant stick insects, eastern long-necked turtle, redback spiders, lace monitors and vibrant Australian birds who join the Tasmanian devils, red-necked wallabies and emu to create a bio-diverse Australian precinct. The development is the second part of the Zoo's $120m 10-year-development plan.

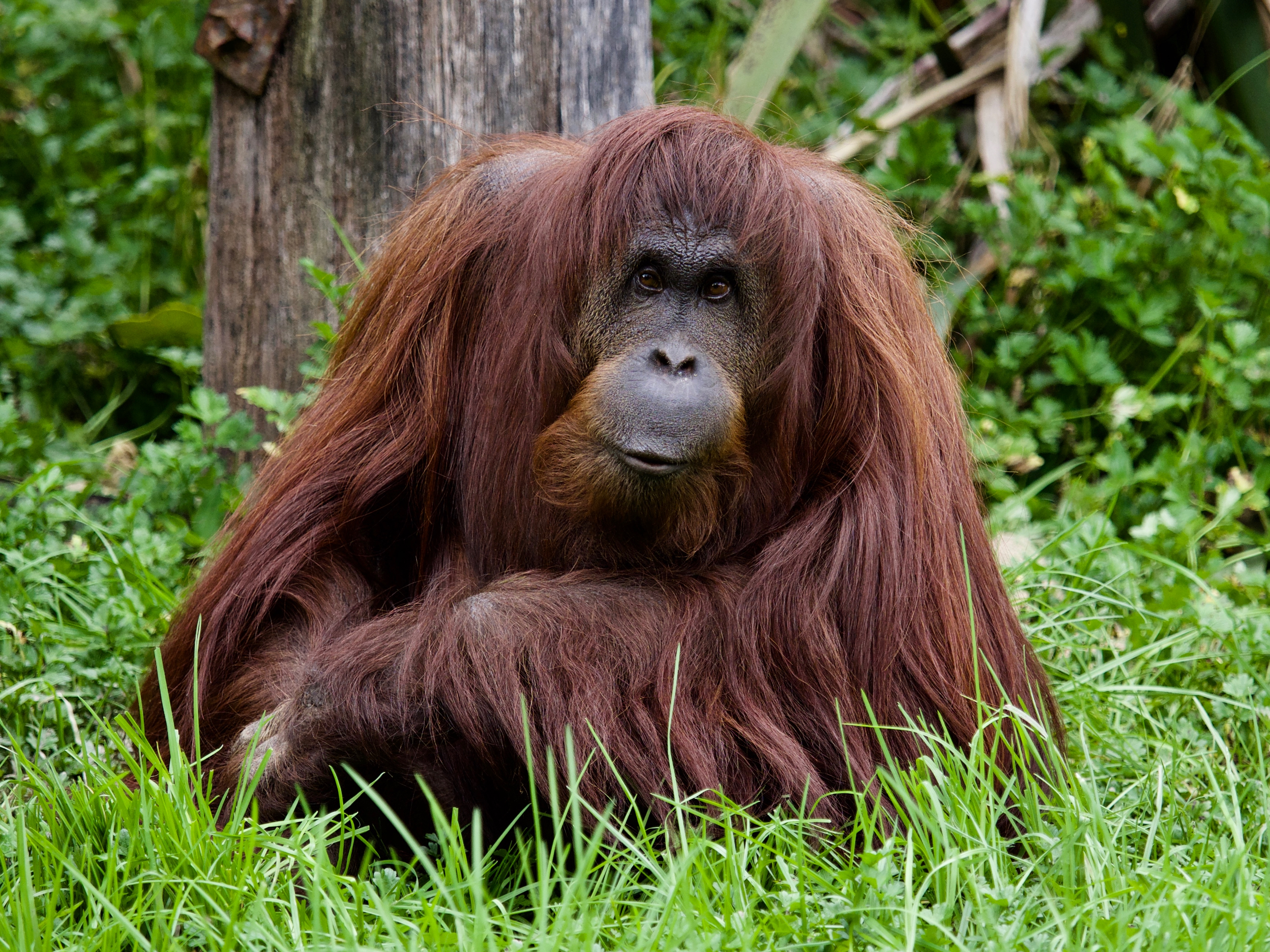
Orangutan at the zoo, 2017

In January 2017, the morning of New Year's Eve, Auckland Zoo welcomed the arrival of twin giraffe calves born to 7-year-old mother, Kiraka. This event is extremely rare in giraffes with a little over 30 documented cases worldwide. Unfortunately, the twins were born prematurely and both relatively light in bodyweight. The female calf managed to stand and start suckling quite early, however the male was very weak, unable to suckle or function independently and did not form a bond with Kiraka. Despite the dedication of the Pridelands and vet teams, the male calf did not improve and the difficult decision was made to humanely euthanise him. The female calf has been named Kabili.

Also in January 2017, for only the second time in its history, Auckland Zoo welcomed a greater flamingo chick into the world. The chick hatched on 3 January that year. In 2014, the zoo made headlines for being the first in Australasia to breed greater flamingo chicks, as well as the first zoo in the world to successfully breed from an entirely hand-reared flock. Auckland Zoo has a flock of greater flamingos, which are the only flamboyance of flamingos in Australasia.

In February 2017, Auckland Zoo's young male giraffe Mtundu set sail for Sydney bound for a new life at Mogo Zoo.

In April 2017, the zoo's male Rothschild giraffe Zabulu, had to be euthanised. 19-year-old Zabulu had been unwell, but deteriorated rapidly the day before he died. Despite the efforts of all involved, Zabulu's welfare and quality of life could not be maintained and he was euthanised. This left Auckland Zoo with a single-sex giraffe herd of three females.

== Tracks and habitats ==
In 2011 Auckland Zoo was home to over 1,400 individuals representing 135 species, and covered 16.35 hectares (40 acres). The zoo is organised into exhibition areas grouped by region of origin which are listed below.

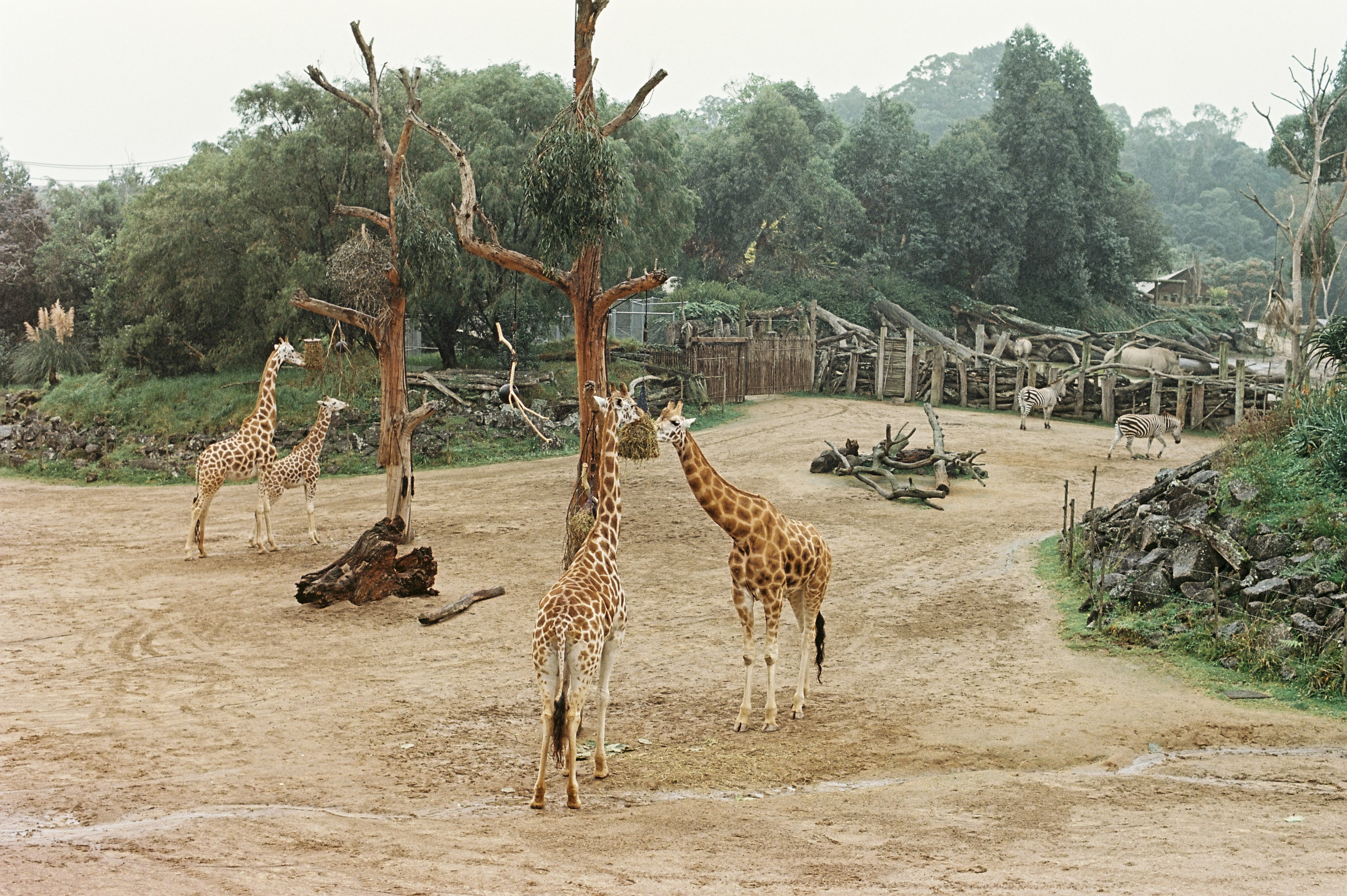
Giraffes at Africa Safari Track

- Africa Safari Track – Along this track, giraffes, plains zebras and common ostriches are all found in one large enclosure which is first viewed from above on a boardwalk, while nyala and southern white rhinoceros share the opposite enclosure. An expansive walk-through aviary located next to the giraffe enclosure is home to masked lovebirds, meerkats, Cape porcupines and leopard tortoises. This area also offers ground level views looking out over a watering hole to the giraffes and zebras, and is themed to resemble a rocky escarpment tumbling down onto the savannah. Continuing along the path is the African lion habitat. The Africa Safari Track also features greater flamingos, hamadryas baboons, cheetahs. An African themed cafe named 'The Watering Hole', is located in this precinct next to the lions and flamingos.
- Australia Bush Track – This track begins with a mixed walk-through habitat which red-necked wallabies and emus share, this leads to an aviary containing rainbow lorikeets, red-tailed black cockatoos and Gouldian finches. After the aviary, the path continues to an indoor habitat room with lace monitors, redback spiders, social huntsman spiders and goliath stick insects. The habitat leads out to an aviary featuring eastern water dragons and rainbowfish. It connects to a Tasmanian devil habitat and brolga enclosure. An additional exhibit along this track is the home of a male sulphur-crested cockatoo named Captain.
- Elephant Habitat – This was the home of the zoo's (and country's) only Asian elephant, Burma. The precinct featured a pool with a waterfall and mud wallow. In November 2024, Burma and her keepers were transferred to Monarto Safari Park in Australia. The old elephant house was converted into a restaurant.
- South East Asia Jungle Track – Siamangs and Bornean orangutans live in large exhibits which include an expansive network of aerial pathways for them to climb up to 25 metres high. Also a large transparent climate-controlled tropical dome mimicking the hot and humid climate of an Indonesian swamp forest for Sunda gharials and other reptile and fish species such as Asian arowanas featured and exhibits for Sumatran tigers and Asian small-clawed otters also features.
- South America Rainforest Track – Full of naturalistic exhibits this area boasts a grand entrance with tarantulas leading to a rainforest track that features a number of primate species namely black-handed spider monkeys, golden lion tamarins and black-capped squirrel monkeys. This area continues to a recently finished group of enclosures exhibiting more animal species. Here you will find American alligators, green iguanas, a group of cotton-top tamarins and emperor tamarins. The track also includes the renovated Galápagos tortoise exhibit. Also included in this area is the Lizard Lane, which contains multiple species of lizard like Cunningham's spiny-tailed skinks, eastern blue-tongued lizards and sheltopusik.
- Te Wao Nui – "Te Wao Nui" (a Māori-language phrase meaning "the living realm") features six ecological New Zealand environments; The Coast, The Islands, The Wetlands, The Night, The Forest and The High Country, and is home to more than 60 native New Zealand animal species including a
- , little penguins, Malherbe's parakeets, Antipodes parakeets, tuataras, New Zealand longfin eels, brown teals, North Island brown kiwi, morepork, Little Barrier giant wētā, kākā, kererū, North Island saddlebacks, tūī, kea, takahē and blue ducks. The habitats also feature 110 different plant species native to New Zealand.
- Other animals – Other animals include ring-tailed lemurs, scarlet macaws and red pandas.

== Auckland Zoo Centre for Conservation Medicine (AZCCM) ==
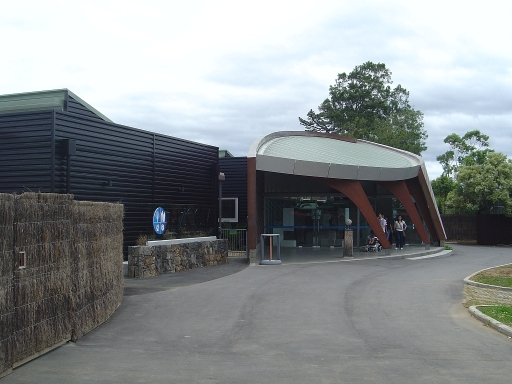
The Auckland Zoo Centre for Conservation Medicine

The AZCCM was opened on 10 August 2007 and originally named the New Zealand Centre for Conservation Medicine. This NZD $4.6 million, 980 square metres (10,500 sq ft) facility is the first national centre for conservation medicine in the world. The operating theatre is visible to the public and surgery is sent via cameras above the operating table to screens in the gallery. Researchers can also be watched while at work.

The viewing gallery features exhibits with a range of specimens including preserved remains of animals that required amputation, and small animals that have been mounted in the past, information about the transmission of diseases between humans and animals, microscopic images projected on a large screen (controlled by the visitor), and the different anatomies of various species. The zoo describes conservation medicine as, "A practice that addresses the connections between our (human) health, with the health of animals and the environment".

== Conservation ==
The Auckland Zoo Conservation Fund was established in 2000 and provides financial support to conservation projects in 12 key regions in New Zealand and overseas. The six New Zealand regions are: the Coast, the Islands, the Wetlands, the Night, the Forest and the High Country. The six international regions are: Africa, Nepal, Pacific Islands, South America, Southeast Asia and Sri Lanka. Auckland Zoo supports conservation through captive breeding programmes, education, advocacy and research. Zoo staff are also sent to assist projects in New Zealand and overseas, where they lend and develop their specialist skills.

In July 2009, following Cadbury's decision to add palm oil to their chocolate, Auckland Zoo made the decision to pulling the company's products from its shops, restaurant and animal feed because of the damage palm oil production does to rainforests in south east Asia, home to animals such as the sumatran tiger and orangutan. The decision, backed by Wellington Zoo, was further supported by users of social networking sites who set up "boycott Cadbury" groups, and a petition was signed urging Parliament to warn consumers about palm oil. Following immense public pressure, Cadbury removed palm oil from its products the following month.

In September 2010, Auckland Zoo sent one of its female red panda, Khosuva to Darjeeling Zoo, northern India, to become part of a breeding programme to repopulate India's Singalalia National Park near Nepal. Khosuva's offspring would be released into the wild to support Project Red Panda's working to create the Panchthar-Ilam-Taplejung corridor to connect isolated red panda populations along the India-Nepal border.

== Conservation learn ==
The zoo helps educate school children about their own environment and the animal kingdom in general at the Discovery and Learning Centre. Another feature offered by the zoo are function facilities including an overnight stay option and twilight tours (Safari Nights) as well as behind-the-scenes experiences.

The zoo also runs a Junior ZooKeeper programme which allows children aged 6–13 years to see what it is like to be a zookeeper for a day. The programme runs during school holidays and activities include helping to clean, feed and care for various zoo animals.

== See also ==
- The Zoo (TV series)
