= The Zoo (New Zealand TV series) =

- Narrated by: Bill Kerton
- Country of origin: New Zealand
- No. of series: 12
- No. of episodes: 120

Production
- Executive producer: Andrea Lamb
- Running time: 30 minutes
- Production company: Greenstone TV

Original release
- Network: TVNZ
- Release: 1999 – 2013

The Zoo was a New Zealand observational documentary series, made by Greenstone TV, that followed the lives of Auckland Zoo's animals and zookeepers. The series explored the new arrivals and births of Auckland Zoo, to the fights, illnesses and mating rituals, how the animals are fed and how they live. The series' production crew were based full-time at the zoo, but the series also followed zookeepers overseas on zoo-related trips.

The Zoo returned to New Zealand's TV One in 2013 for its 13th and final season. In the UK, it aired on Animal Planet.

== Zoo staff ==
=== Season 12 staff stars ===
- Christine Tintinger - Senior Primate keeper
- Amy Robbins - Team Leader of Primates
- Nat Sullivan - Team Leader of Pridelands
- Andrew Coers - Team Leader of Elephants and Sea Lions
- Bethany Jackson - Vet-in-residence
- Richard Gibson - Team Leader of Reptiles and Invertebrates
- Natalie Clark - NZ Birds Keeper

=== Main staff stars ===
- Sandra Rice - Senior Carnivore keeper
- Carly Day - Primate keeper
- Laurel Sandy - Elephant & Sea Lion keeper
- Richard Gibson- Team leader of reptiles and invertebrates
- Richard Jakob-Hoff - Senior Veterinarian - Conservation and Research
- John Potter - Senior Veterinarian

=== Former staff stars ===
Zoo keepers who have previously starred on the show.

- Trent Barclay - Senior Carnivore keeper (departed Auckland Zoo)
- Maria Barclay - Senior Vet nurse (departed Auckland Zoo)
- Sam Stephens - Senior Pridelands keeper (deceased whilst working at Hamilton Zoo, appears on Wild Vets)
- Mike Harvey - Keeper
- Tania Crook - Keeper
- Brooke Noonan - Curator
- Maria Finnagan - Curator

== Animals ==
=== Current animal stars (series 12) ===
- Oz (Sumatran tiger)
- Molek (Sumatran tiger)
- Berani (Sumatran tiger)
- Doris (alligator)
- Osiris (cheetah)
- Anubis (cheetah)
- Janie (chimpanzee)
- Burma (elephant)
- Kaioko (fur seal)
- Moana (fur seal)
- Orua (fur seal)
- Atamai (fur seal)
- Jelani (giraffe)
- Zubulu (giraffe)
- Rukiya (giraffe)
- Kiraka (giraffe)
- Nakuru (giraffe)
- Faith (hippopotamus)
- Fudge (hippopotamus)
- Maya (red panda)
- Mosi (meerkat)
- Shiloh (zebra)
- Charlie (orangutan)
- Melur (orangutan)
- Madju (orangutan)
- Wanita (orangutan)

=== Former animal stars ===
- Snorkel (hippopotamus)- euthanized 1 October 2010
- Kashin (elephant) - euthanized 24th Aug 2009
- Nisha (sumatran tiger) - *eta deceased May 12, 2006
- Hari (Asiatic golden cat) - departed Auckland Zoo
- Hoi-An (Asiatic golden Cat) - departed Auckland Zoo
- Saigon (Asiatic golden Cat) - departed Auckland Zoo
- Indra (25-year-old Bornean orangutan) - departed Auckland Zoo

== Seasons ==
=== Season 1 (1999) ===
The premiere season of The Zoo.

=== 2004 ===
This season premiered on TV2 on Sunday 5 September.

=== Season 8 (2006) ===
Ep No.	NZ Air Date	Description	Viewers
1	16 Jul 06	After months of waiting, Melur the orangutan finally gives birth to a beautiful baby boy and the keepers are there to witness the special event.	-
2	23 Jul 06	Melur the orangutan introduces her baby to the big wide world for the first time. Trent is in South Africa to see how his cheetah babies have grown and tries taking them for a walk on a lead.	-
3	30 Jul 06	The animals of Auckland Zoo get their first taste of snow, as the keepers bring in a truckload for a mid-summer treat and Baby Madju makes a bid for independence.	-
4	6 Aug 06	It's chaos as Asha attempts to weigh the crazy cotton-top tamarins and Bakari the zebra baby takes his first shaky steps into the big wide world.	-
5	13 Aug 06	The zoo is buzzing as the cheetah cubs finally arrive from South Africa and the spider monkeys have a ball when a surprise pops up in their enclosure.	-
6	20 Aug 06	Itam, the siamang gibbon, unexpectedly needs surgery. The bats get a midnight treat and the new cheetahs spend their first day at Auckland Zoo.	-
7	27 Aug 06	Bakari the zebra foal finds a playmate when he meets the giraffe baby for the first time, Andrew visits NZ's rarest bird in its native habitat and the cheetahs check out the neighbourhood.	-
8	3 Sep 06	Nisha the tiger falls ill and the team struggle to find out what is wrong, Irian the siamang heads off to Australia for a new life and the lemurs find several surprises in their enclosure.	-
9	10 Sep 06	The zoo is in shock as Nisha the tiger's condition gets much worse. Meanwhile, Christine is in Australia with Irian the siamang gibbon as he meets his new mate for the first time.	-
10	17 Sep 06	The zoo is kept busy as Jin the otter makes a daring escape and starts popping up in various far-flung locations around Auckland and Irian the siamang moves in with his new Aussie missus.	-
11	24 Sep 06	Amy and Dave visit the Auckland chimpanzees in their new home at Hamilton Zoo. The vets and keepers struggle to weigh the enormous Galapagos tortoises and the Natives team go bush to find out what's ailing the zoo's rare frogs.	-
12	1 Oct 06	-	-
13	8 Oct 06	The Pridelands teamwork into the night as a baby giraffe struggles to be born and The Zoo heads to Tel Aviv to meet Auckland Zoo's new Sumatran tiger, 'Oz', before he leaves his family.	-
14	15 Oct 06	In Israel, Oz the tiger prepares to leave for his new life in New Zealand. Back home, the Pridelands team face a tough decision as the baby giraffe takes a turn for the worse.	-

=== Season 9 (2007) ===
Ep No.	NZ Air Date	Description	Viewers
1	29 Jul 07	Oz the Sumatran tiger wows the crowds as he settles in, while his new mate Molek begins the journey to join him. Meanwhile, the spider monkeys welcome an unexpected baby.	-
2	5 Aug 07	Big changes are in store for Oz the tiger as his new mate Molek moves in next door. Mandhla the blind rhino proves that big doesn't mean brave, and Madju the baby orangutan turns one.	-
3	12 Aug 07	Oz the tiger stays cool in the pool, but his new mate Molek takes a turn for the worse. The Natives team gets clucky when two kiwis hatch, and the spider monkeys have a prickly problem.	-
4	19 Aug 07	In Cameroon, Amy takes her life in her hands when she comes face-to-face with an injured gorilla. Back in Auckland, Orua the baby fur seal pops up unexpectedly.	-
5	26 Aug 07	Trent's plans to let the cheetahs run free are put on hold as Osiris goes worryingly lame. And, in Cameroon, Amy tries to help a baby chimp with a horrific past.	-
6	2 Sep 07	The hippos head out for the first time in years - straight into rhino territory. Osiris the cheetah is rushed into surgery, and in Cameroon, baby chimp Gah comes out of his shell.	-
7	9 Sep 07	Osiris the cheetah puts his leg to the test as the speedy brothers go on the run. On her last day in Africa, Amy meets the fearsome mandrills and says goodbye to the baby chimps.	-
8	16 Sep 07	A new rhino's about to be born, the keepers get a rare close encounter with the elusive bonnet macaques and the zoo's big cats race to solve a problem.	-
9	23 Sep 07	A massive migration gets underway as four rhinos hit the road and Janie the chimp finds herself surrounded by jungle - and some strange new companions.	-
10	30 Sep 07	The primate team is in shock as things take a devastating turn for Iwani the siamang gibbon and an endangered takahe is brought in needing unusual medical attention.	-
11	7 Oct 07	Things go from bad to worse for little Iwani as a life hangs in the balance at siamang central. The meerkats test their luck when a very prickly customer - Dialo the porcupine moves in.	-
12	14 Oct 07	Dume the giraffe calf leaves home, the keas astound everyone with their problem solving and it's a battle for supremacy when a newcomer moves in with the baboons.	-
13	21 Oct 07	In the series final things are looking up for Sumatran tiger Molek, and as Kruger the rhino settles into Hamilton, a very cute baby joins the rhino herd.	-

=== Season 10 (2008) ===
This series aired on TV2.

Ep No.	NZ Air Date	Description	Viewers
1	14 Sep 2008	Molek and Oz, the Sumatran tigers, finally get a look at each other as they take their first steps towards parenthood. Plus, there is serious concern for Kashin the elephant.	-
2	21 Sep 2008	-	-
3	28 Sep 2008	-	-
4	5 Oct 2008	-	-
5	12 Oct 2008	-	-
6	19 Oct 2008	Iwani the siamang gibbon and his family swap houses, Kura the lioness is injured in a fight, and in Thailand, Laurel goes swimming with a one-month-old baby elephant.	-
7	26 Oct 2008	-	-
8	2 Nov 2008	-	-
9	9 Nov 2008	-	-
10	16 Nov 2008	-	-
11	23 Nov 2008	-	-

=== Season 11 (2010) ===
Ep No.	NZ Air Date	Description	Viewers
1	24 Jan 2010	The tiger cubs celebrate their first birthday; lion keeper Nat comes face-to-face with the one animal she's afraid of; and baby orangutan Madju gets a bouncing surprise.	493,100
2	31 Jan 2010	Nat takes the plunge and faces her fears; in Sumatra, orphaned orangutan babies find comfort with Amy and Carly; and Kashin the elephant has everyone worried.	495,800
3	7 Feb 2010	A little blue penguin is brought to the vet clinic; a devastating turn of events causes the zoo to close its gates; and in Sumatra, Amy and Carly take a wild ride deep into the jungle.	622,000
4	14 Feb 2010	Burma the elephant takes her first steps into life without Kashin; a big decision is made about tiger mum Molek; and in Sumatra, Amy and Carly try to teach the baby orangutans how to climb trees.	577,450
5	21 Feb 2010	The vet team try to find out what's wrong with tiger mum Molek; there's an unexpected delivery on Baboon island; and in Sumatra, the baby orangutans must try to make it on their own.	519,580
6	28 Feb 2010	It's life or death for the baboon baby, as the new boys move in; the world's rarest parrot makes an emergency landing at the vet clinic; and Iwani's parents leave home.	523,000
7	7 Mar 2010	The arrival of two newborn otters takes everyone by surprise; Christine is on a mission to help Iwani the siamang get his girl; and vet Richard goes bush to try and check on an old patient.	564,980
8	14 Mar 2010	Visitors think they have seen a snake in the grass at the zoo; Christine heads to Australia to play matchmaker for Iwani; and the two baby otters have an appointment with the vet.	516,860
9	21 Mar 2010	The lions aren't sure what to make of some strange intruders in their enclosure; a baby otter is rushed into emergency surgery; and Christine Tintinger has to say goodbye to a 25-year friendship.	486,750
10	28 Mar 2010	Keeper Lana is in Australia to get to grips with some aggressive alligators; and it's an emotional day at Auckland Zoo, as the orangutans head to a new life in Florida.	640,330

=== Season 12 (2012) ===
Premiered on Sunday 29 July 2012. Currently airs on TV One at 7pm on Sundays.

Ep No.	NZ Air Date	Description	Viewers
1	29 Jul 2012	The cameras are there as tigers rip into a fresh deer hide pinata, Burma the elephant swims in a fresh lagoon, and young giraffe Jelani heads off over the ditch on his big OE.	609,300
2	5 Aug 2012	See a day in the life of the zoo's oldest resident, Janie the chimpanzee; giraffe Jelani finds his sea legs; and the keepers rescue wild birds after the Rena oil spill disaster.	598,290
3	12 Aug 2012	There's a cheeky new kid on the block; red panda Maya has lost her appetite; and the orangutans try their hand at painting.	651,630
4	19 Aug 2012	Shilo the zebra fights for her life; the great otter swap is on; and mischievous keas renovate their new home.	659,360
5	26 Aug 2012	Giraffe Zabulu gets a new playmate; Melur the orangutan behaves for the vet; and reptile keepers pull out all the stops to get Smiley the tortoise in the mood for love.	644,490
6	2 Sep 2012	The zoo's new spider monkeys deliver a lot of laughs; Molek the tiger undergoes a root canal; and keepers uncover some of the mysteries of our rarest frogs.	621,800
7	25 Nov 2012	Giraffe Rukiya is pregnant, fifteen shore plovers are released onto Motutapu Island, and the zoo's cheetah brothers go on an early morning walkabout.	599,320
8	2 Dec 2012	Doris the alligator is suffering from a locked jaw and has trouble eating. Elsewhere, Auckland Zoo keepers assist with a night-time round-up of kiwi on Motuora Island.	633,570
9	9 Dec 2012	The seal encounter goes high tech with a brand new underwater communication system, the zoo's porcupine pair go underground, and a wild kaka shot with a slug gun goes into surgery.	536,010
10	16 Dec 2012	Lion Lazarus is crate training for his trip across the ditch, and there is a bouncing bonanza in the Aussie Walkabout, with brand new joeys and a wallaby round-up.	499,970

== Specials ==
=== Zoo Babies (2002) ===
This 1-hour The Zoo special takes a look at pregnancy, birth and infancy at Auckland Zoo. Explores the successes and failures of trying to breed giraffes, lions, orang-utans, tigers, pink flamingos and the native New Zealand tuatara.

=== Zoo Babies 2: Raising Baby Iwani (2005) ===
The story of Baby Iwani, the siamang gibbon, who was rejected by his mother and 'adopted' by zookeeper Christine Tintinger. This 60-minute special leads up to the day Christine has to give him back to Mum.

== Spin-off series ==
=== Two By Two At The Zoo (2005) ===
Two By Two At The Zoo is a series made up of ten episodes of specials from The Zoo series. Two By Two At The Zoo explores Auckland Zoo's favourite animals and the keepers who care for them.

==== Episodes ====
- Episode 1: Red Panda babies
- Episode 2: Treating Kashin
- Episode 3: Rhino enclosure
- Episode 4: Tea party chimps
- Episode 5: Kiwi Breeding Programme
- Episode 6: Kura the Cub of Lion Hill
- Episode 7: Emergency care for Siamang Gibbon twin babies
- Episode 8: Entertaining a Tiger
- Episode 9: Iwani the Siamang Gibbon reuniting with his parents
- Episode 10: Hippos changing homes

=== Trent's Wildcat Adventures (2006) ===
Popular Auckland Zoo zookeeper Trent Barclay has a passion for wild cats. In this series of ten episodes, Trent travels to South Africa to encounter wild cats up close and personal in their natural African habitat.

=== The Zoo: This Is Your Life (2008) ===
The Zoo spin-off series, The Zoo: This Is Your Life, celebrates five special Auckland Zoo animals. The series follows Indra the orangutan, Kashin the elephant, Kura the lioness, Zabulu the giraffe and Kito the rhinoceros. It features archive video footage and photos, and interviews current and former keepers. All stories feature highs and lows including births and traumatic deaths, stressful journeys, life-threatening illness and daring escapes.

==== Episodes ====
Episode	NZ Air Date	Description	Viewers
Indra the Orangutan	14 Sep 2008	Indra the orangutan arrived at Auckland Zoo 25 years ago and stole the hearts of everyone she met. Indra gave birth to her first baby and the first orangutan to be born at Auckland Zoo. She made the headlines after making a daring escape, and a terrifying health scare later threatened Indra's life. Enjoy the fascinating and emotional story of this lovable ape whose life at the zoo was about to come full circle.	-
Kashin the Elephant	21 Sep 2008	Kashin the elephant was a New Zealand icon and one of the oldest and most recognizable residents of Auckland Zoo, after arriving in 1972 from America when she was just four years old. Famous for her easygoing personality she made front page news when she attacked an intruder while recovering from an operation on her foot. This is a gripping and endearing story of New Zealand's much loved personality.	-
Kura the Lioness	28 Sep 2008	Kura the lioness arrived at Auckland Zoo as a frightened little cub, eight years ago and then, through some nerve-wracking encounters, she let everyone know who was the boss on Lion Hill. Her "don't mess with me" attitude meant she called the shots, but being a mum let her gentle side show. Much admired, occasionally misunderstood, we take a fascinating look at the exciting and unpredictable life of a very special animal.	-
Zabulu the Giraffe	5 Oct 2008	Zabulu the giraffe was just a shy one-year-old lad when he set off on a grueling 48-hour journey by boat from Christchurch to Auckland Zoo back in 1998. Nervy and shy he also showed a resilience in his early years that set him apart as something special. Zabulu coped with the hurdles that life set before him, growing up to quietly dominate Pridelands with his regal presence. This is a delightful story of Zabulu from his first wild days at sea to his heady domination of Pridelands and all his gripping adventures in-between.	-
Kito the Rhino	12 Oct 2008	Kito was the first rare southern white rhinoceros to be born at Auckland Zoo and since the day she first arrived her short life was full of dramas. Absolutely adorable as a baby her effervescent spirit made her hundreds of fans but her arrival also threatened to tear her family apart. When she was just three a tragic accident would affect Kito's life forever and ultimately force her to leave the only home she had ever known. Here is the whole story of little Kito's eventful life and how she eventually overcame adversity.	-

== DVD releases ==
- Best Of The Zoo: Highlights 1, 2, 3
- Best Of The Zoo 2: Highlights 4, 5, 6
- Best Of The Zoo 3: Highlights 7, 8, 9
- Best of The Zoo 4: The Complete Series 10 (2011)
- Best of The Zoo 2012: Series 12 (2012)
- Best of the Zoo: Box Set - Highlights from Series 1 - 9; Zoo Babies & Raising Baby Iwani
- Zoo Babies & Raising Baby Iwani
- The Zoo: This Is Your Life

== Awards ==
=== Qantas Media Awards ===
- Winner (2004): Best Information Programme
- Winner (2001): Finalist
- Winner (2000): Finalist

=== NZ TV Awards ===
- Winner (2001): Most Popular Family Programme

=== TV Guide 'Best on the Box' ===
- Winner (2007): Favourite Documentary Series
- Winner (2006): Favourite Documentary Series
- Winner (2005): Favourite Documentary Series
- Winner (2004): Favourite Documentary Series
- Winner (2003): Favourite Documentary Series
- Winner (2002): Favourite Documentary Series
- Winner (2001): Favourite Documentary Series
