= Western Springs Reserve =

Public park in Auckland, New Zealand

- Te Wai Ōrea
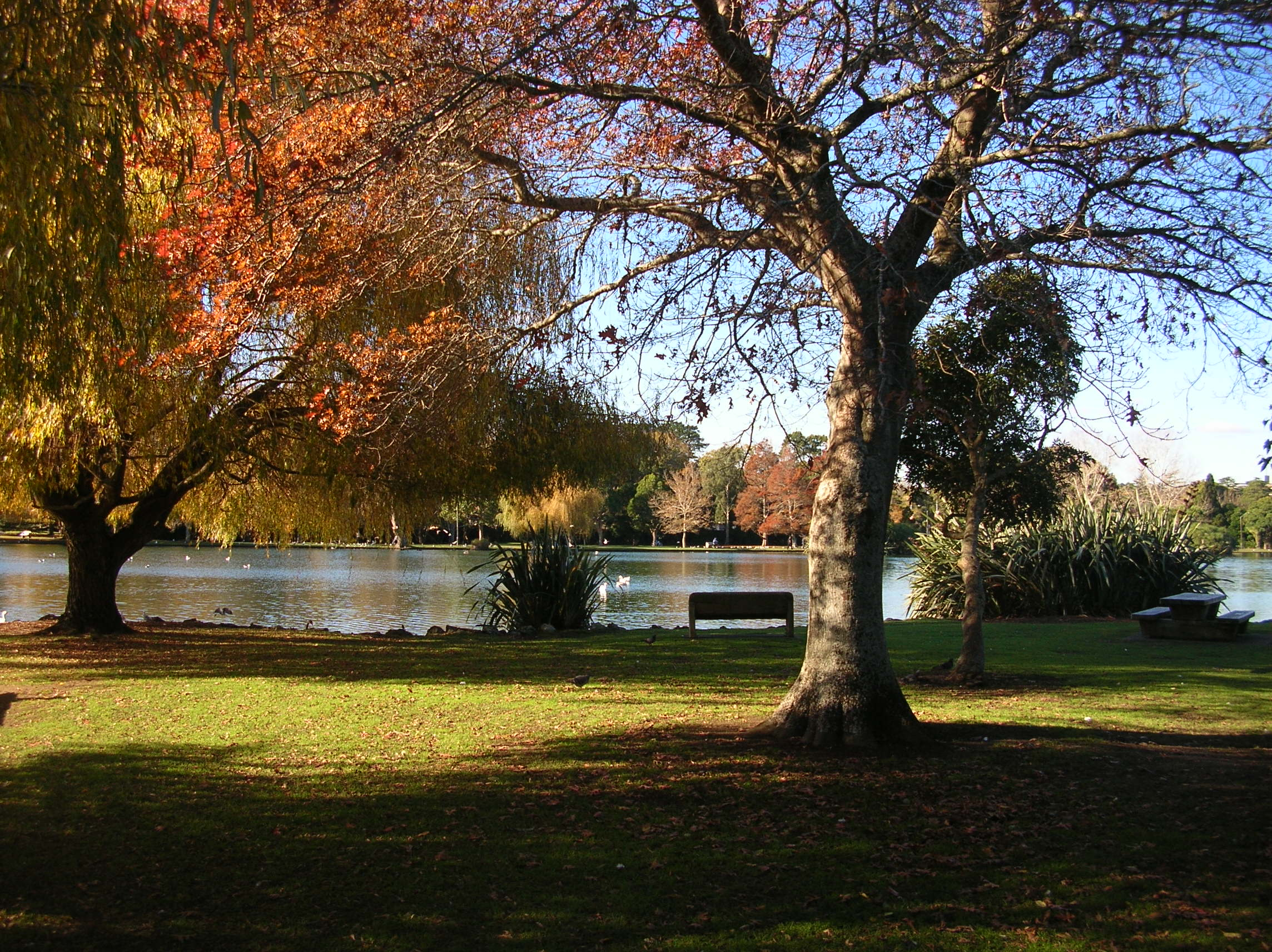
- Park seating overlooking the lake at Western Springs
- Interactive map of Western Springs Reserve
- Type: Public park
- Location: Western Springs, Auckland, New Zealand
- Coordinates: 36.864°S 174.723°E
- Area: 64 acres (26 ha)
- Created: 1977
- Operator: Auckland Council
- Status: Open year round

Western Springs Reserve, also known as Western Springs Lakeside Te Wai Ōrea, consists of a sanctuary for wildlife, surrounding a lake fed by the natural springs. There are walking paths surrounding the lake with bridges going across sections of it. Auckland Zoo, Museum of Transport & Technology and Western Springs Stadium are all situated around the park.

Park facilities include a playground, picnic tables, barbecue facilities, public toilets, drinking fountains, public artwork, the Circle of Friends Memorial Garden and the Fukuoka Garden.

== Geography ==
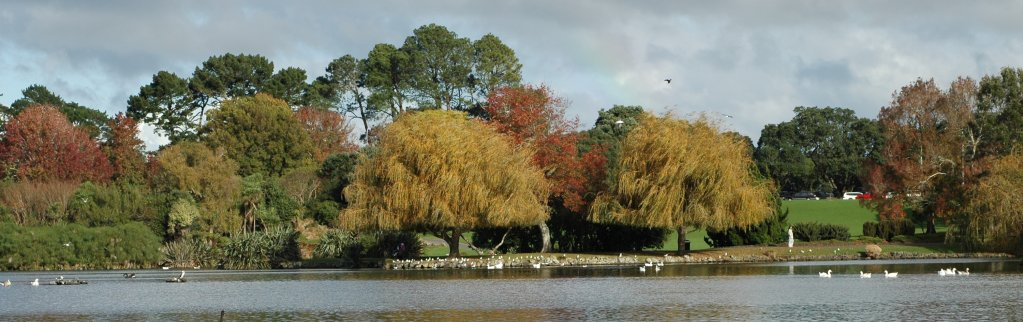
The park's artificial dammed lake is fed from a natural freshwater aquifer.

The park is the site of a natural freshwater aquifer, where water comes through the surface through cracks in basalt lava flow from Te Tātua a Riukiuta. Prior to European settlement, the land was primarily a pūriri lava rock forest ecosystem, a now rare ecosystem consisting of plants growing in a minimal soil environment, growing amongst rock and leaf humus.

== History ==
=== Early history ===
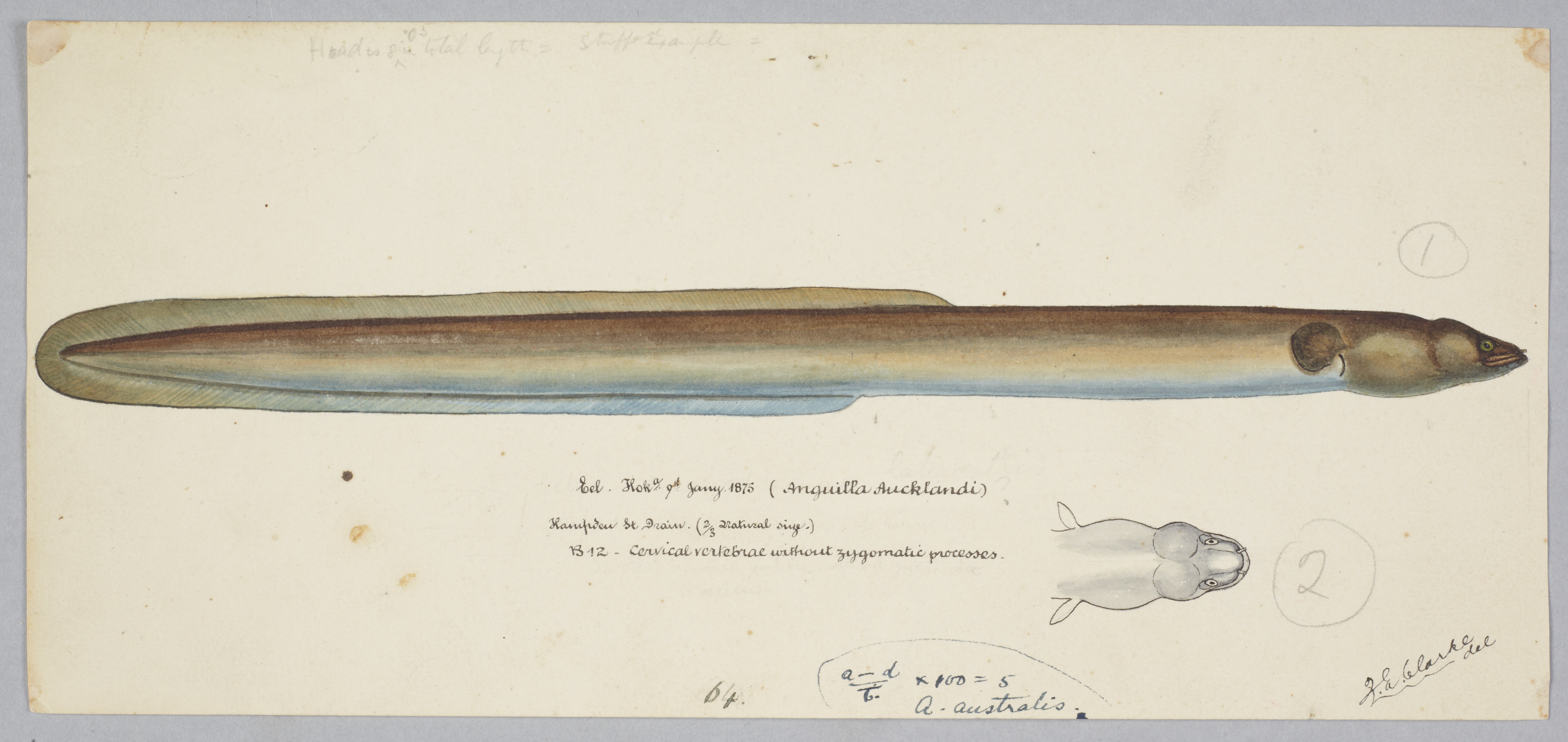
Ōrea or New Zealand long fin eel illustrated in 1875

Historically, Western Springs was one of two major wetlands in the central Auckland area and was a significant site for Tāmaki Māori who valued it for its clean, clear water and for the harvesting of ōrea or New Zealand long fin eels. The aquifer and wetland have the traditional Māori name Te Wai Ōrea to, which means 'the waters of eels'.

A traditional Māori story involves Ruarangi, a chief of the supernatural Patupaiarehe people, escaping a siege on Ōwairaka / Mount Albert through lava tunnels and emerging at Te Wai Ōrea.

=== Later history ===
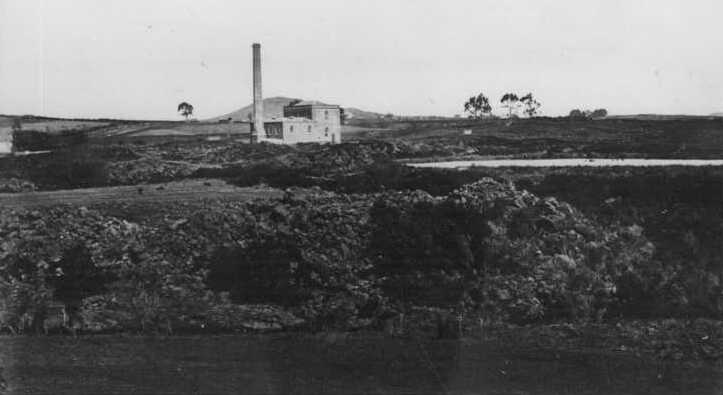
The Western Springs lake and pumphouse in 1880

In 1830-40, during the Māori musket wars, Ngati Tahinga, Waiohua and Te Taou lived in the wider area, which was named Te Rehu.

In 1877, an earth dam was constructed to create a larger artificial lake, in order to serve as the source of Auckland's drinking water. The Western Springs lake was the source for Auckland's drinking water for the next 30 years. The English name was chosen to differentiate the springs from those at Auckland Domain, which was the previous major water source for Auckland. The springs were used until 1928, when they were superseded by damming projects in the Waitākere Ranges.

In 1922, the Auckland Zoo was opened adjacent to the lake, followed by the Western Springs Stadium in 1929 and Museum of Transport & Technology in 1964. During the Depression in the early 1930s, the area adjacent to Motions Road was developed as a camping ground. During World War II, the camping ground was used as a military camp for the United States Armed Forces. Afterwards, Western Springs was proposed as a site for an amusement park in 1953, however this did not eventuate due to a lack of funding. In 1961, the Auckland City Council parks department began administering the area, and in 1977 it was officially opened as a public park.

In 2001, The New Zealand Circle of Friends Memorial Garden, was established in the park's Kānuka Grove, including a stone memorial engraved with the names of 50 people who have died from HIV/AIDS in New Zealand.

The Fukuoka Gardens was developed in the park in 1989, gifted to Auckland by Fukuoka in recognition of their sister city relationship. This garden was officially added to the park in 2017, and includes a pavilion, waterfall, pond and over 1800 native Japanese and New Zealand species.

== Biodiversity ==
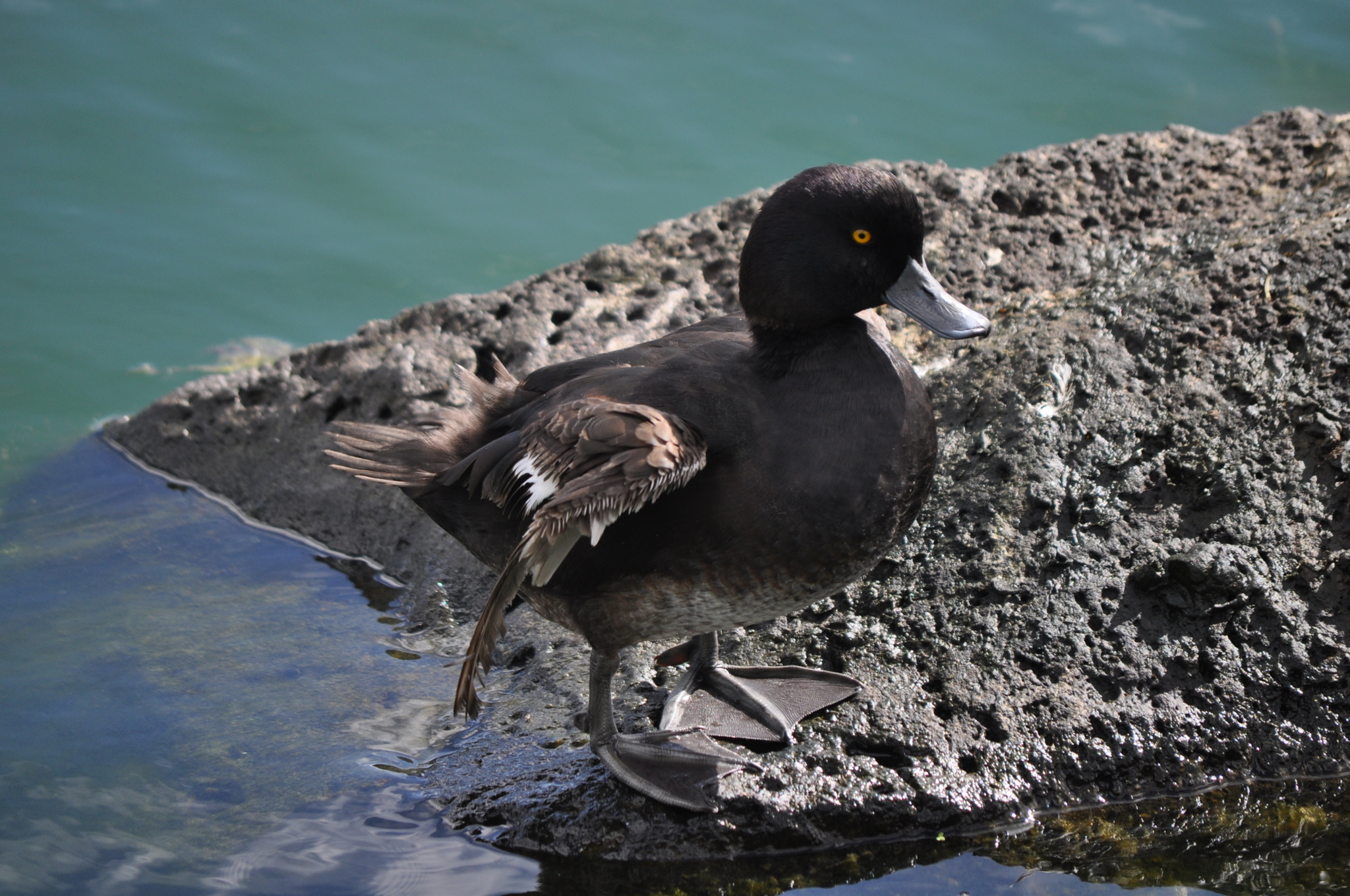
A New Zealand scaup seen at Western Springs

Waterfowl, such as swans, pūkeko and ducks make up a significant proportion of the visible wildlife of the park. While birdfeeding has historically been a large draw for the public to come to the park, this behaviour is being discouraged due to the negative effects this has on the environment.

The park is home to significant numbers of native eels, Anguilla australis and Anguilla dieffenbachii, in addition to a number of pest species such as koi carp. Grass carp were introduced into the lake in 2005, in order to control invasive plant species.

The park has a mix of exotic and native plant species. A number of threatened and rare New Zealand species are found in the park, including the haplolepideous moss Fissidens berteroi, short-hair plume grass (Dichelachne inaequiglumis), and the parasitic vine Cassytha paniculata (mawhai).

== Gallery ==
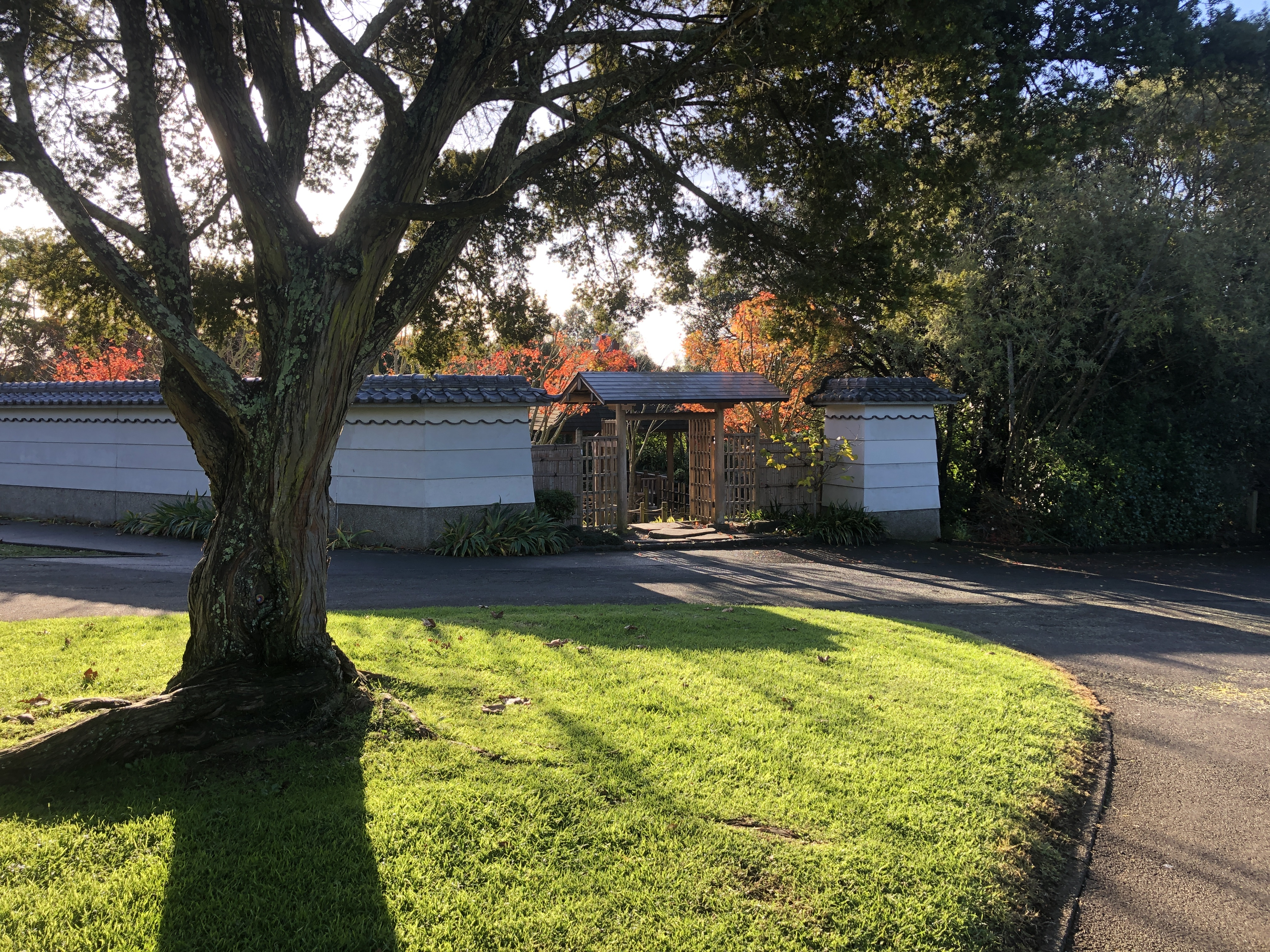
Fukuoka Garden exterior wall and entrance

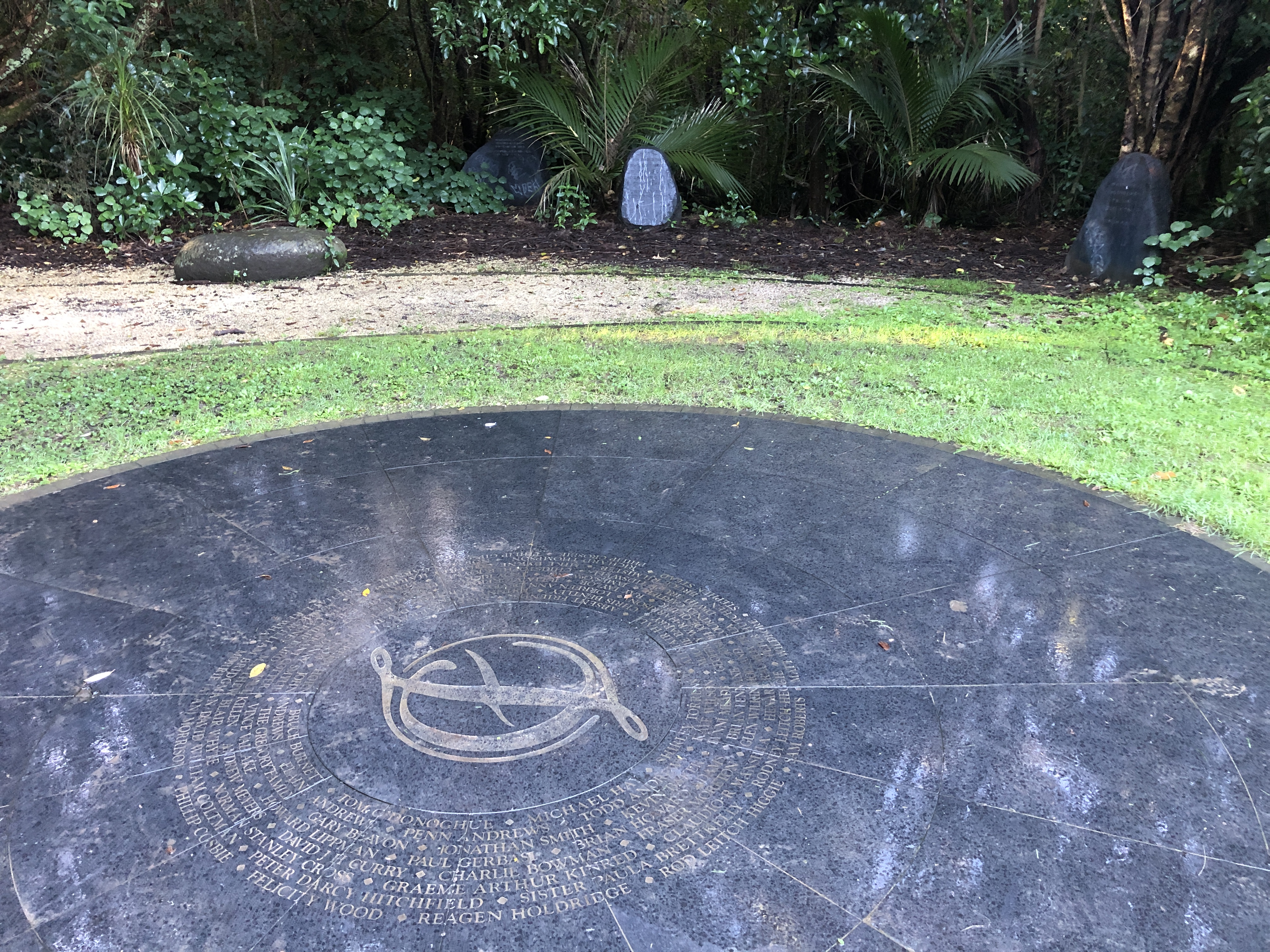
Circle of Friends Memorial Garden

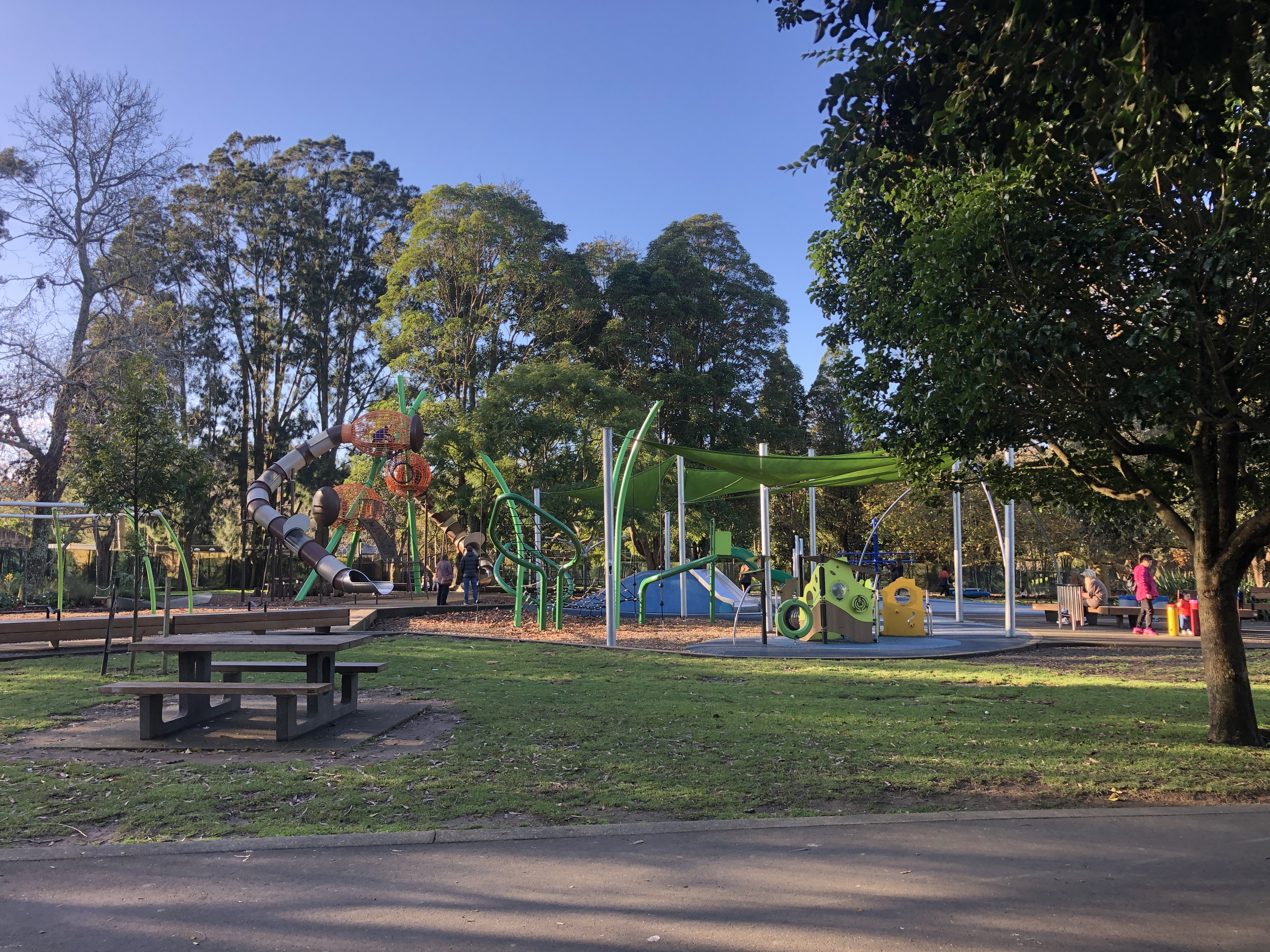
Park playground
