= Museum of Transport and Technology =

Museum in Auckland

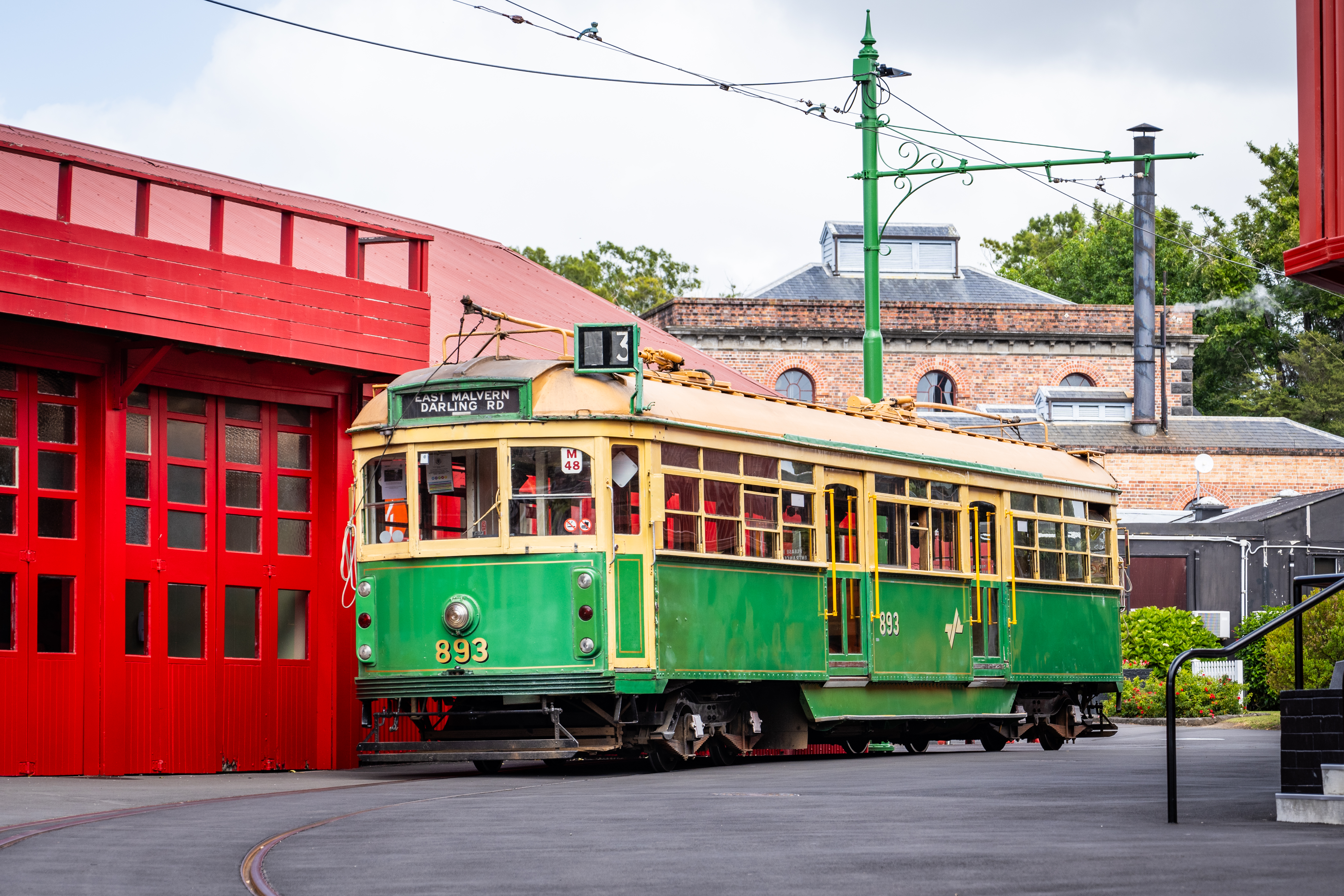
- MOTAT Tram 893 at MOTAT Great North Road
- Established: March 1964; 62 years ago
- Location: Western Springs, Auckland, New Zealand
- Coordinates: 36.8673°S 174.7276°E
- Type: Transport museum
- Website: www.motat.nz www.motatsociety.org.nz

The Museum of Transport and Technology (more commonly known as MOTAT) is a transport and technology museum located in Western Springs, Auckland, New Zealand. Established in 1960 and formally opening in 1964 as a location for the preservation of trams and early New Zealand transportation technologies, the museum has large collections of civilian and military aircraft, other land transport vehicles, and includes exhibitions focusing on transportation, science and history. The museum features live exhibits which display working transportation, including the Western Springs tramway, which links the two main sites of the institution, MOTAT Great North Road and the MOTAT Aviation Hall on Motions Road. MOTAT is largely managed by volunteers, supported by full-time professional museum staff.

== Scope ==
MOTAT's collections and exhibitions focus on New Zealand technologies and innovations, including transportation, aviation, and work, and involves engaging youth with STEM.

== Location ==
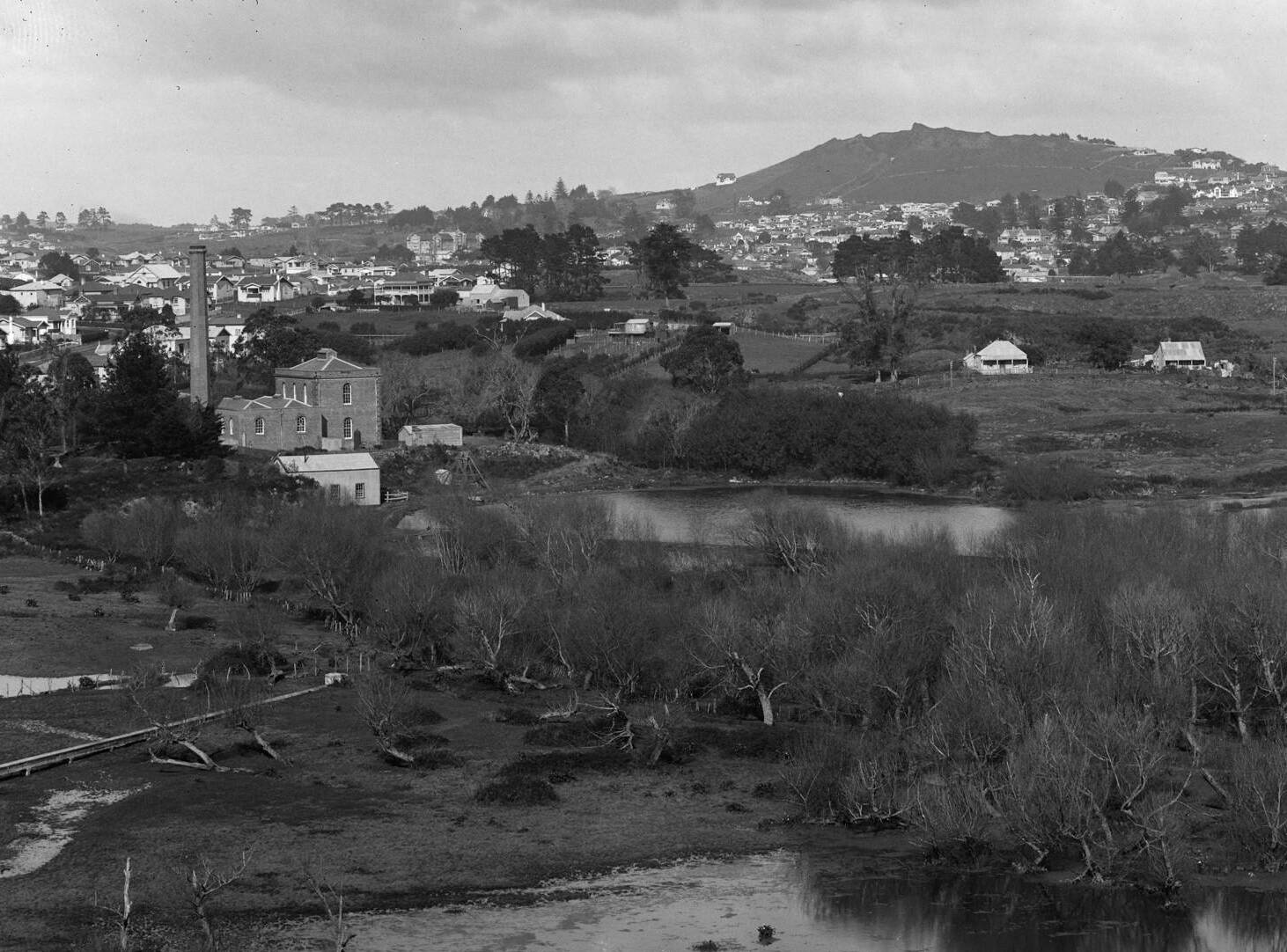
The Western Springs Pumping Station, future site of MOTAT, in 1924

MOTAT is located in the suburb of Western Springs, Auckland, New Zealand. The area of Western Springs near MOTAT was traditionally known by Tāmaki Māori as Te Wai Ōrea, a place known for clear spring water, and a harvesting spot for eels. During the 1830s and 1840s, members of Ngāti Tahinga, Waiohua and Te Taoū of Ngāti Whātua lived in the area. In 1846, Scottish settler William Motion established Low and Motion's Four Mill, which operated until 1875. The land was then bought by the Auckland City Council, who established an artificial lake and built the Western Springs Pumping Station at the site, which sent water to reservoirs in Auckland from 1877. Pumping from the site was gradually phased out from 1907 during the establishment of water reservoirs in the Waitākere Ranges, and completely ceased in 1936.

MOTAT has two locations, both in Western Springs. The first is MOTAT Great North Road, located on the corner of Great North Road and Stadium Road, which is adjacent to Western Springs Reserve. The second is the MOTAT Aviation Hall, located at 98 Motions Road, adjacent to Motions Creek, Western Springs College and Meola Reef. The two locations are connected by the Western Springs Tramway, a tramway operated by MOTAT using heritage trams.

=== MOTAT Great North Road ===
The MOTAT Great North Road site (also known as MOTAT 1) features exhibits include trams, trains, vintage traction engines, carriages, cars, buses, trolleybuses and trucks, particularly fire engines, electrical equipment, space flight exhibits including a Corporal rocket and general science exhibits. The location features the original pumping station, Te Puawānanga Science and Technology Centre, the Walsh Memorial Library, tram barns and workshops, the original Waitākere railway station, which houses model railway exhibitions, and the MOTAT print shop.

MOTAT's pioneer village, set between 1840 and 1890, features buildings transported from across the Auckland Region, including the original Wainui School house built in 1878, two Fencible cottages, the Chapel of the Good Shepherd (originally St. Saviour's Anglical Church in Blockhouse Bay), and a working blacksmith (the only newly constructed building in the village, stocked with 19th century tools). Adjacent to the pioneer village is a 1920s shopping street.

=== MOTAT Aviation Hall ===
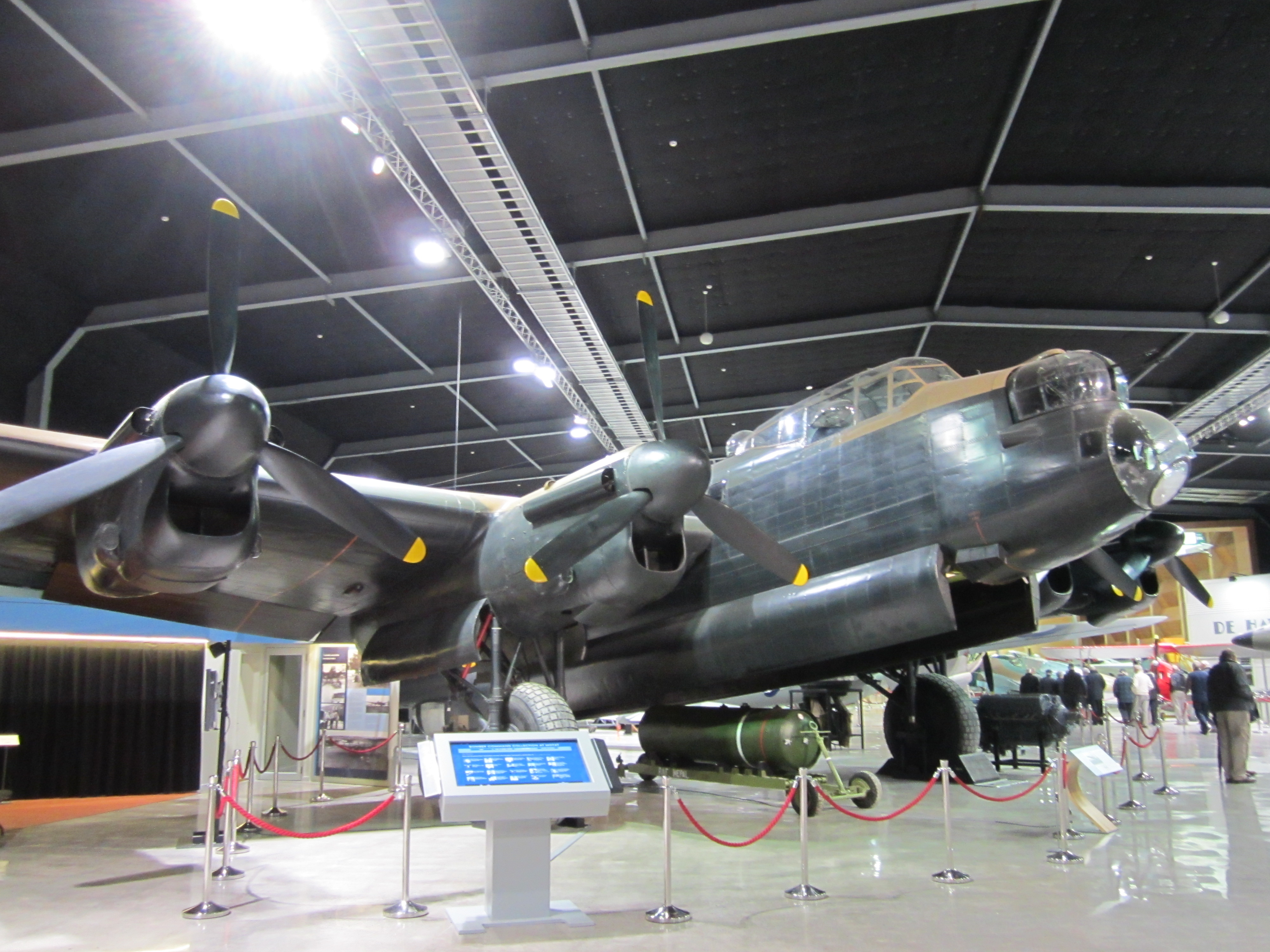
An Avro Lancaster bomber at MOTAT 2

The MOTAT Aviation Hall (also known as MOTAT 2 or MOTAT Motions Road) was opened in 1977, as the Sir Keith Park Memorial aviation pavilion. The site includes the aviation collection of MOTAT, including Royal New Zealand Air Force (RNZAF) aircraft, memorials to Fleet Air Arm and RAF Bomber Command pilots, and exhibits on World War II military trucks. The site is also home to MOTAT's rail workshops, which includes the Western Springs Railway, on which live engines have travelled between Waitītiko Station or Sir Keith Park Station since 1982.

=== Tram service ===
Trams are operated daily between MOTAT, alongside the Western Springs Park and precinct, past Auckland Zoo to the MOTAT Aviation Hall and connect both Museum sites. Tramlines on sleepered track set under bitumen were laid within the museum boundaries with trams commencing operation on 16 December 1967. The Museum tramline was later extended beyond the Museum grounds along Great North Road and opened on 19 December 1980. A further extension along Motions Road to Auckland Zoo commenced services on 5 December 1981 using rail set in mass concrete. Between 2006 and 2007 the tram line was further extended by a distance of 636 m (2,087 ft), to the aviation hangar at MOTAT 2, the service commencing on 27 April 2007. The tramway is dual gauge, employing 4-foot and 4-foot 8 1/2 inches gauges, the rail welded and set in mass concrete.

=== Gallery ===
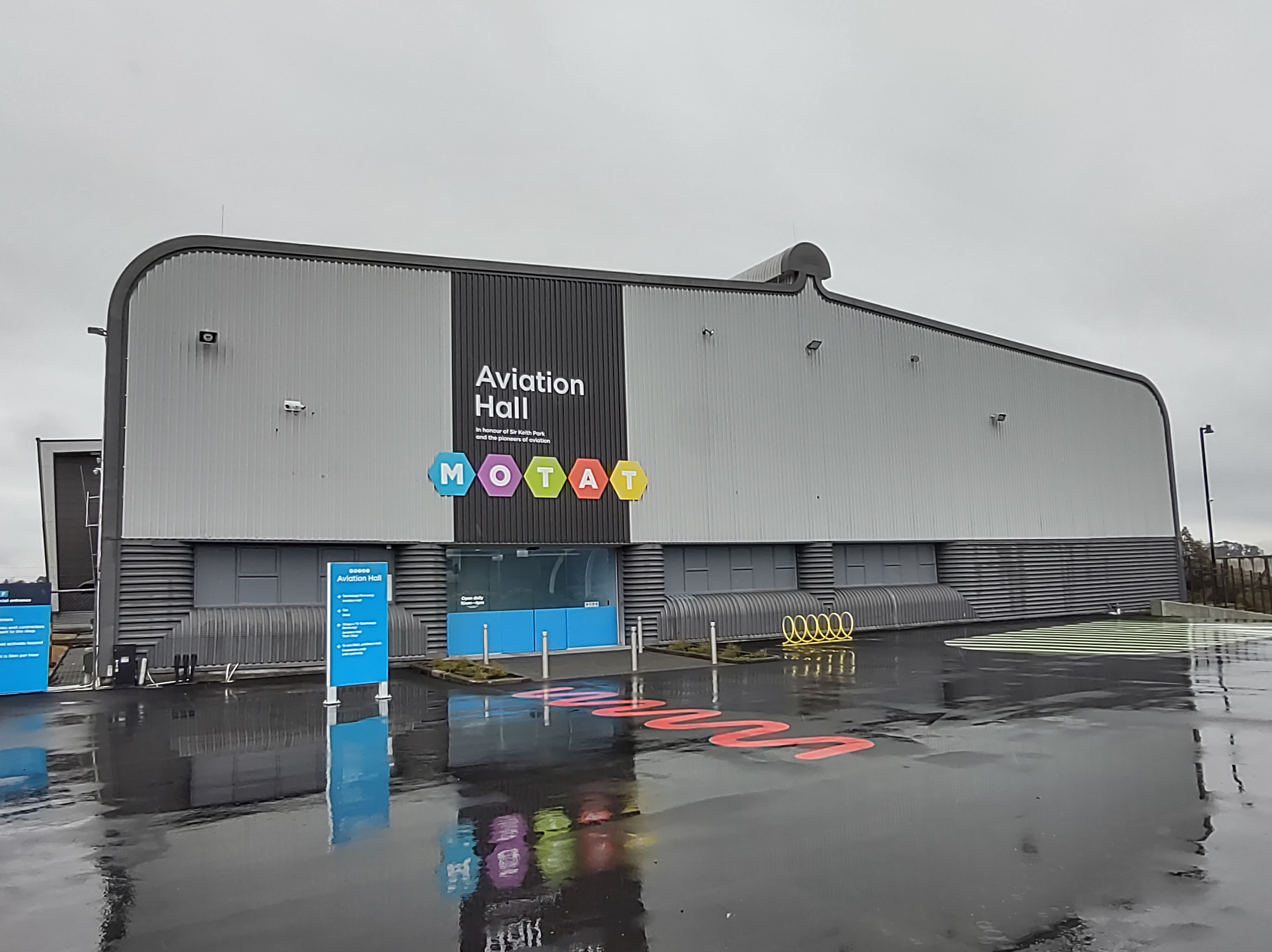
MOTAT Aviation Hall

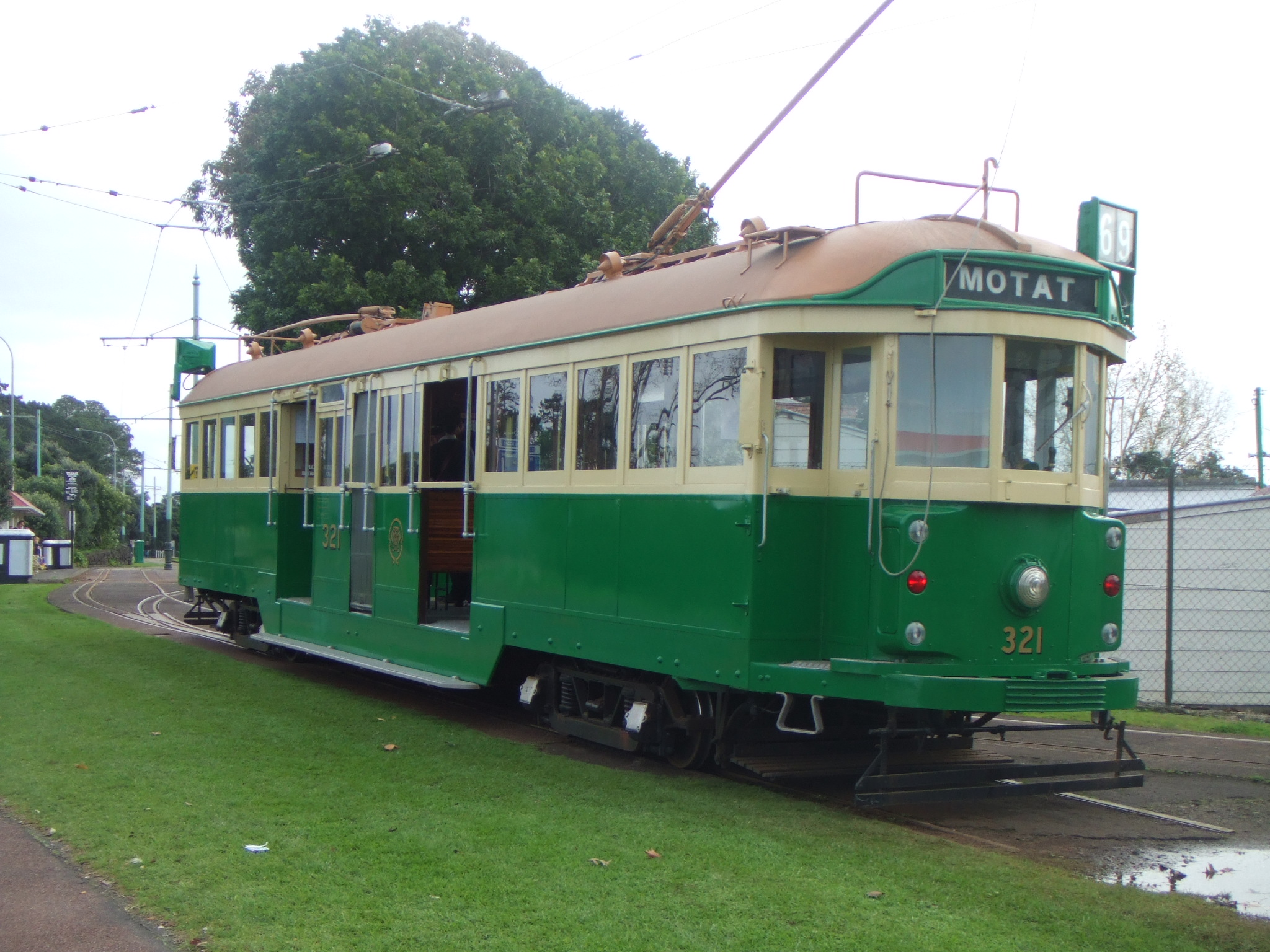
A MOTAT to Zoo tram service operated by Melbourne W2 class tram #321, Auckland, 2006

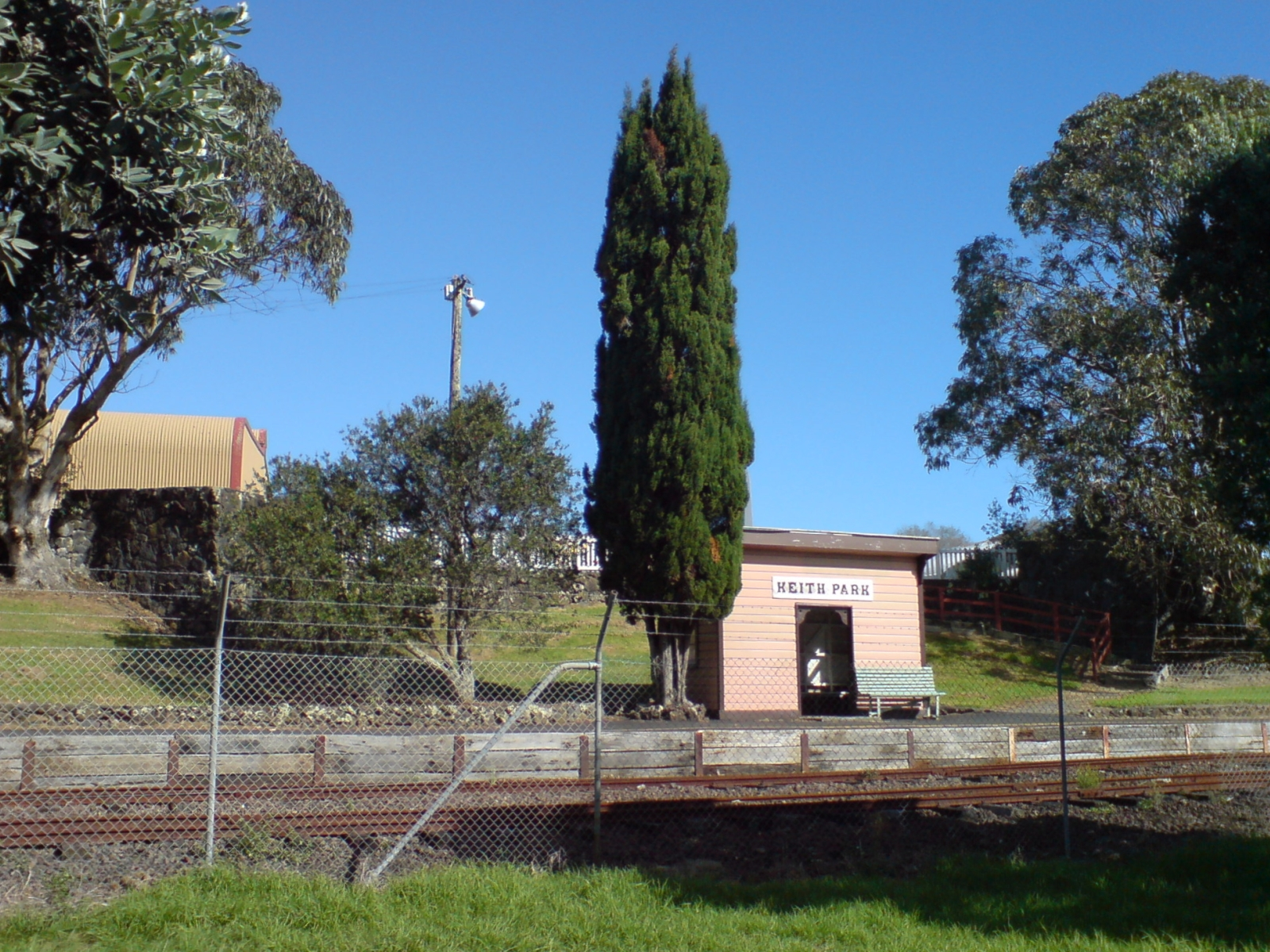
Keith Park Train Station

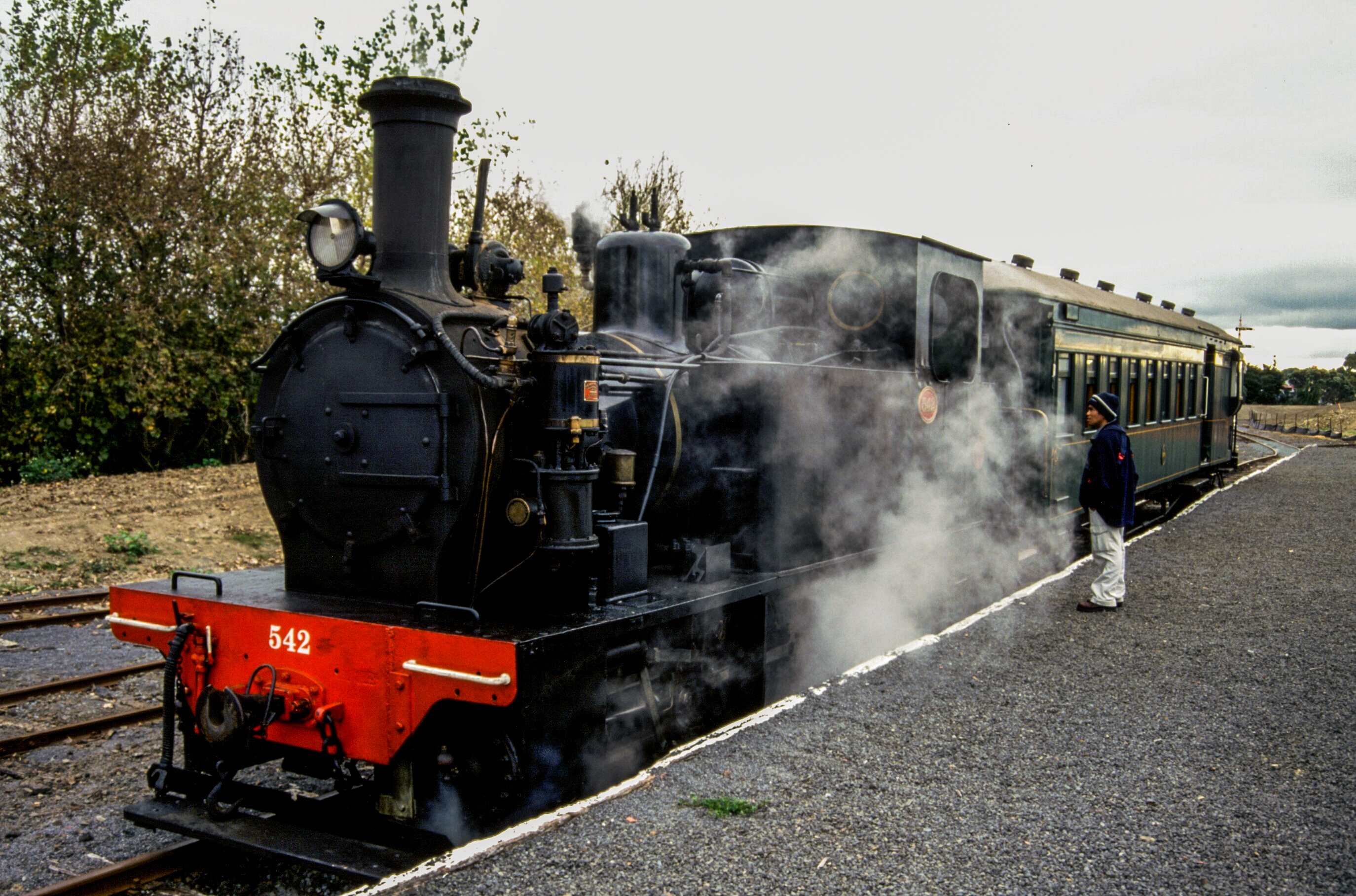
Y542 at MOTAT

== History ==
=== Old Time Transport Museum ===
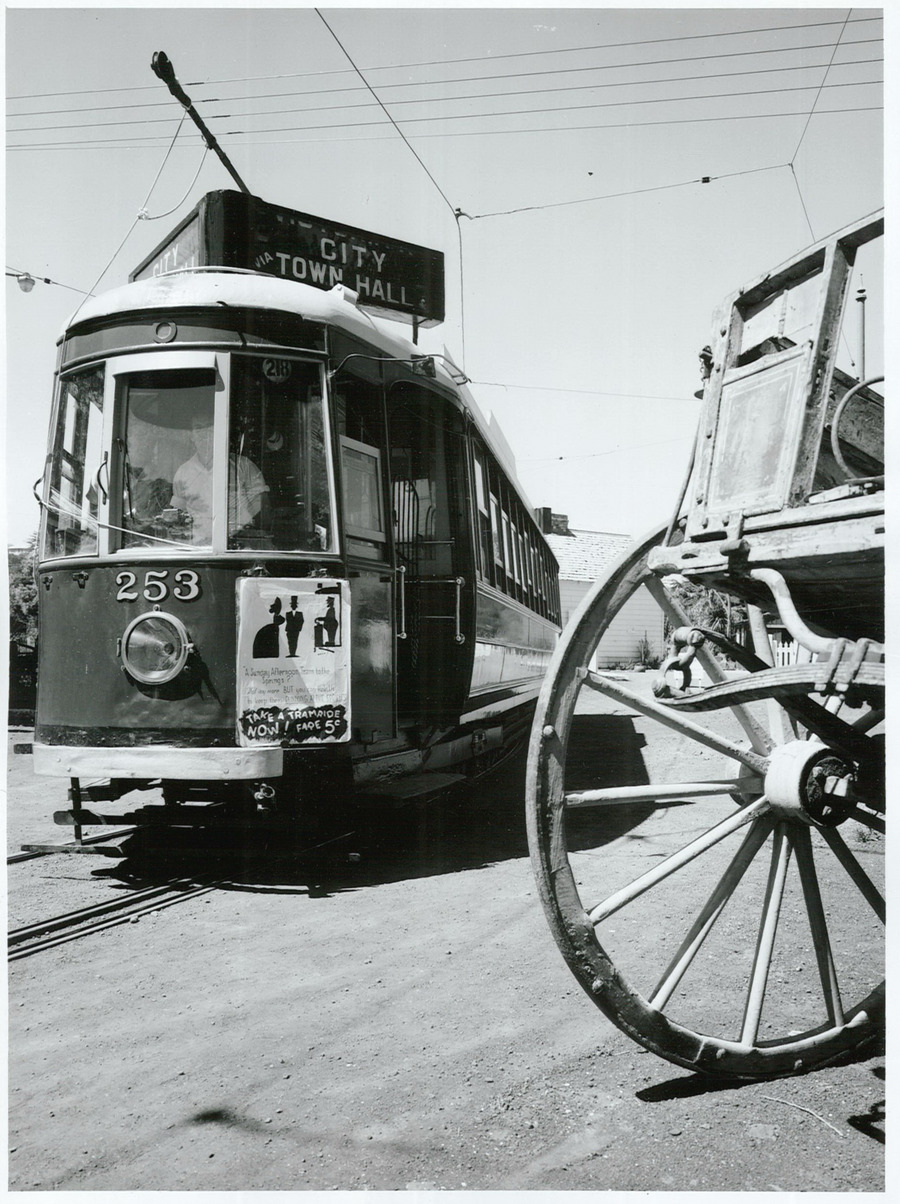
Tram No. 253, the vehicle saved by Graham Stewart and Merv Sterling

MOTAT's origins began with the Old Time Transport Preservation League, an organisation established in 1957 by tram enthusiast Graham Stewart and his cousin-in-law, Merv Sterling. Stewart approached the Auckland Transport Board in 1956, hoping to preserve one of the final trams operating in Auckland, the 'Queen Mary' (tram No. 253), which operated on the Onehunga line. After the closure of the line, the Auckland Transport Board presented the vehicle to Stewart, after finding no other organisations interested in caring for the tram.

In May 1957, Stewart transported the tram to a plot of land in Matakohe, Northland, owned by cousin-in-law, Sterling, and together they established the Old Time Transport Preservation League, a society which operated the Old Time Transport Museum. In June 1957, Sterling's uncle Richard Sterling, a former tram operator, purchased Tram No. 248, a vehicle which he had been the first motorman for when it began service in 1938. Planning to turn the tram into a play room for his children, Stewart convinced Merv Sterling to preserve the vehicle, and send it to the museum at Matakohe. The two trams were joined over the next two years by three trams from Wellington, an 1891 Baldwin steam tram motor from Whanganui, a Dunedin cable car and a de Havilland Tiger Moth, with the league also planning to establish a blacksmith shop.

As the museum was soon running out of space for vehicles, the Old Time Transport Preservation League began discussions with different local bodies to move the collection elsewhere. In 1960, the league asked the Whangarei Borough Council, who declined the offer. In the same year, the league was assisted by Frank Simpson, who, working together with the Royal Aeronautical Society of New Zealand and the Auckland Historical Society, successfully lobbying the Auckland City Council to establish a national transport, aeronautics and technology museum in Auckland. The former site of the Old Time Transport Museum became the Kauri Museum, which opened in 1962.

=== Establishment ===
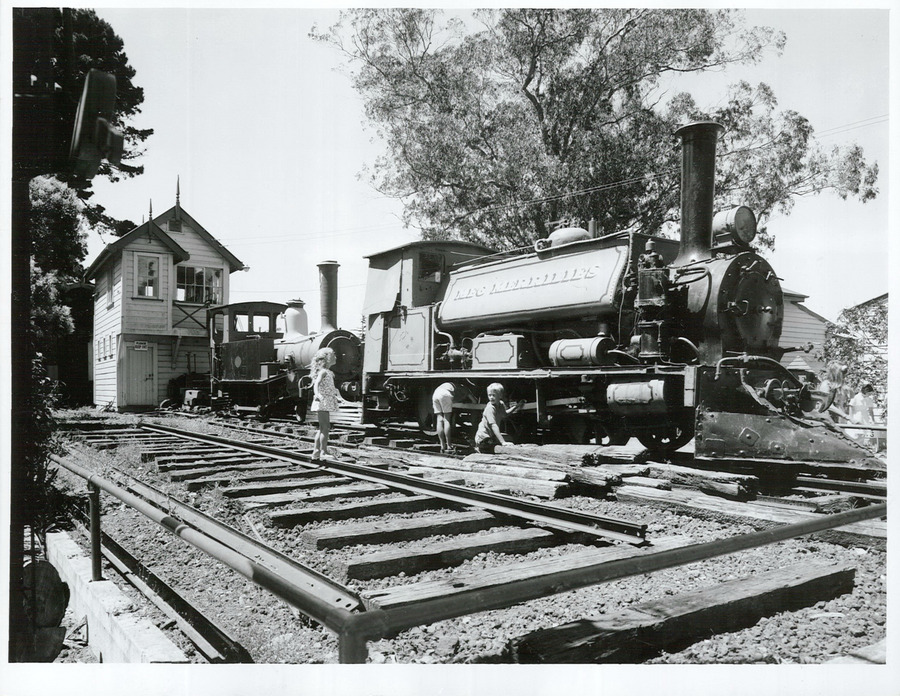
Children playing with a steam engine at MOTAT, 1971

MOTAT was established on 6 July 1960, during a community meeting organised by Frank Simpson and chaired by mayor Dove-Myer Robinson, during which discussions were held to establish a museum preserving transport relics, pioneer artefacts and technological advances. A decision was made during the meeting to establish a transport museum at Western Springs, and aviator George Bolt, former chief engineer of Tasman Empire Airways, was announced as the first curator of the museum. Auckland City Council gifted land for the establishment of MOTAT in 1963. Outside of the land gifted by Auckland City Council and a $60,000 lotteries grant, the museum had minimal government financial support, leading chairman J. Horgan making an urgent appeal to funds to prime minister Keith Holyoake in 1963. Developing the Western Springs site was difficult, due to the land being unsuitable for buildings or housing rolling stock, needing significant development.

The Museum of Transport and Technology officially opened in October 1964, in a ceremony attended by Edward Douglas-Scott-Montagu, 3rd Baron Montagu of Beaulieu. MOTAT in its original form was primarily as an open-air museum, with the historic Western Springs Pumping Station being the only building located on the site at the time of opening. The possibility of two vintage NZR F class steam engines in Canterbury being taken to MOTAT led to protests from railway workers and enthusiasts in the South Island, leading to the formation of the Museum of Science & Industry, which later became Ferrymead Heritage Park in Christchurch.

Within two years of opening, MOTAT had amassed approximately 4,000 volunteers, and received over 100,000 items primarily donated by Aucklanders. As the collections and volunteer base grew, volunteers were structured into different sections, each representing a different focus, including aviation and tramways. MOTAT's photographic and print studio was opened September 1966, and in 1967 the museum gained its first paid employees. In the same year, a gate charge was introduced due financial pressures, a practice that has been unheard-of in New Zealand at the time. On 16 December 1967, the MOTAT tramway was opened by Mayor of Auckland City Roy McElroy and Minister of Transport Peter Gordon. By 1969, over a million people had visited MOTAT.

From 1960, the Auckland Historical Society begun developing a colonial village at MOTAT, with the first Fencible cottage moved to the museum in early 1964. In 1966, the Lawler Sattleday Cottage was moved to MOTAT.

From 1968, an area behind the museum buildings was redeveloped and drained, as a space where rolling stock trains could be stored. The first rolling stock was placed on this section of railway in June 1969, with the first passenger train running at MOTAT, a 0-4-0ST 1912 – Andrew Barclay steam locomotive, in May 1970.

=== Expansion: 1970–1983 ===
MOTAT greatly expanded between 1970 and 1985, requiring a full-time director from 1970. Much of the expansion was fuelled by government-funded work schemes; by 1979, 450 men were employed at MOTAT through these schemes. In 1971, MOTAT acquired a London Double-decker bus through a sponsorship with Waikato Breweries, who used the bus in an advertising campaign. The bus became one of the most popular attractions as MOTAT and a widely recognised feature of the museum, leading MOTAT to purchase a second bus in December 1972. Within the first two years, 410,000 passengers has ridden on the buses, with MOTAT using the vehicles for promotional events, charity trips and advertising campaigns. In 1973, two night guards were charged for requisioning a double-decker bus, after driving the vehicle to Queen Street to purchase food.

In 1972, the Transport Pavilion was erected as the first newly constructed permanent museum building, having been funded by the Auckland Savings Bank to commemorate the Centenary celebrations of the Auckland City Council. In the same year, a 1920s shopping street was constructed, and the original Waitākere railway station was moved to MOTAT, officially opening after refurbishment in the following year.

Beginning in 1973, the Auckland Education Board began appointing education officers, as a response to the growing number of school groups visiting the facility.

In 1977, the Sir Keith Park Memorial aviation pavilion was opened by aviator Jean Batten. Located on Meola Road at a distance from the rest of MOTAT, the site was developed as an area to display the museum's aviation collection. The museum's London double-decker buses were used to transport people between the two sites.

From 1972 to 1982, MOTAT held an exhibition displaying the Gemini Space Capsule. In 1979, the Hall of Electricity opened as the first electrical museum in New Zealand.

MOTAT became a major centre for research into early New Zealand aviator Richard Pearse, and one of the major proponents that led Pearse to become a more recognised figure. The museum holds the remains of Pearse's first plane, the fuselage of his second plane, and his third plane, and collaborated on a recreation of Pearse's first plane for the 1975 New Zealand Broadcasting Corporation (NZBC) television docudrama, Richard Pearse.

In 1977, the Bush Tramway Club, formerly operating at MOTAT, moved to Pukemiro. In the 1970s visitors to MOTAT were entertained by the MOTAT Chorus, a group of barbershop singers who later became the Auckland City of Sails Chorus. By 1982, train tracks had been established at the Meola Road site of MOTAT, and live trains began operating between two stations at the site, linking the aviation hall to the railway workshops.

=== Financial hardship: 1983–2000 ===
MOTAT began experiencing financial difficulties after the summer of 1982/1983, when patronage dropped by 40%, as new competing public attractions had been established in Auckland. In 1983, large numbers of temporary workers and staff were laid off, and the New Zealand Government ceased to provide workers through temporary work schemes. This led the MOTAT Society to gift all of the society's assets to the MOTAT Trust Board.

In 1990, the New Zealand Science Centre was opened at MOTAT. Tensions arose between MOTAT management and volunteers, many of whom were concerned that the centre did not focus as strongly on transport or technology, and were concerned that funding was being diverted from operational costs to go towards the centre. Personality clashes within MOTAT's volunteer groups led to significant numbers of volunteers leaving, with registered members of the MOTAT Society dropping from 423 in 1990 to 182 in 1994.

Faced with declining patronage and fewer volunteers, the MOTAT board appointed management consultant Grant Kirby in 1994 as the museum's manager, and secured annual funding from the Auckland City Council, contingent on performance, and requiring MOTAT to seek funding from other Auckland regional authorities. Kirby instigated major reforms at MOTAT, including large numbers of staff redundancies, with permanent positions dropping from 43 to 9.

In March 2000, the New Zealand Parliament passed the Museum of Transport and Technology Act 2000, a law that required six Auckland regional local government bodies to contribute towards upkeep costs for the museum. Member of Parliament for Auckland Central Judith Tizard was a major proponent of the bill, which was modelled after the Auckland War Memorial Museum Act 1996.

=== Restructuring: 2000–present ===
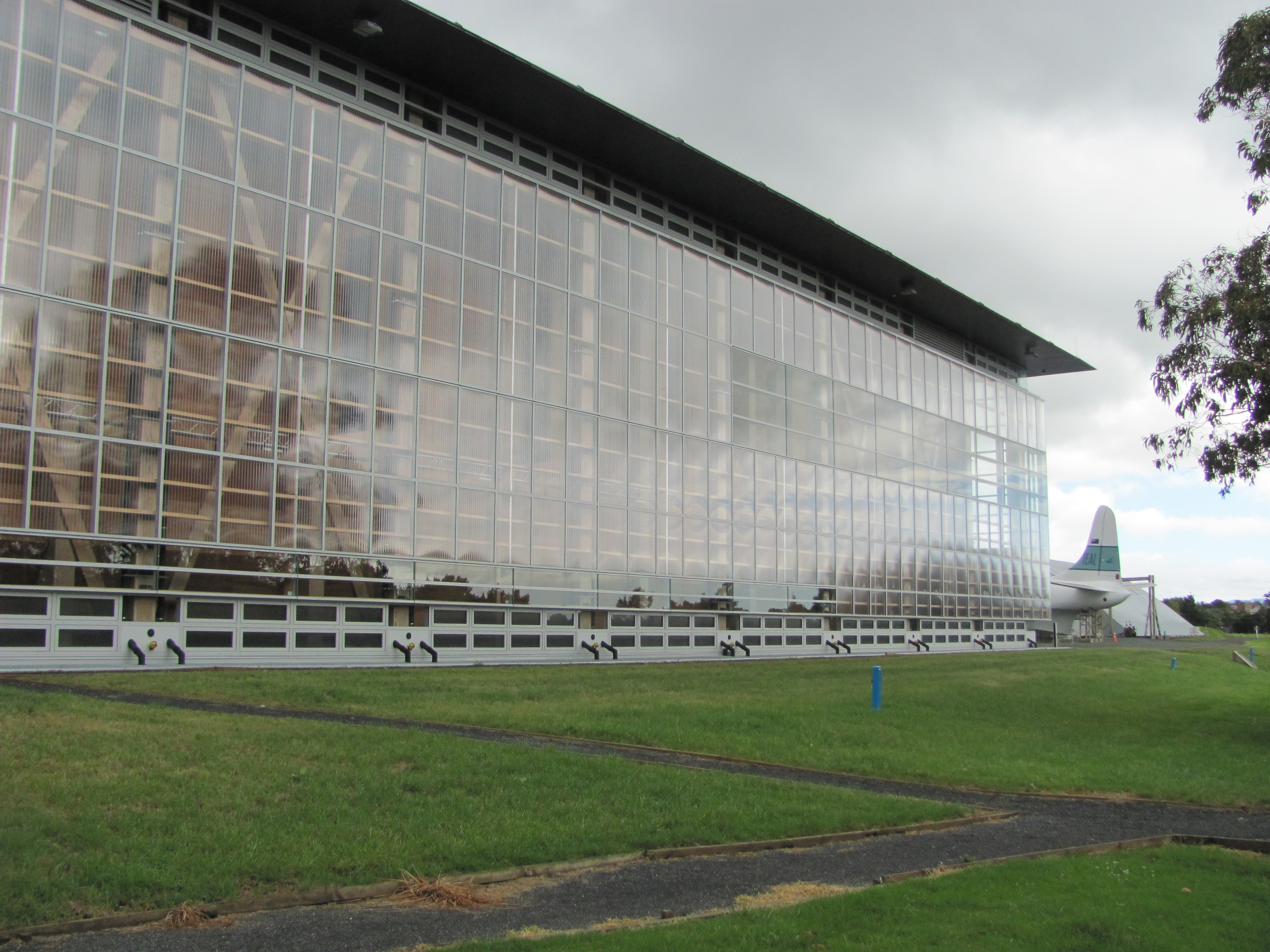
The MOTAT Aviation Display Hall, constructed in 2011

In the early 2000s, restoration work began on the Western Springs Pumping Station. In 2007 the engine moved under pneumatic pressure for the first time in 79 years, and was re-commissioned in a special public opening on 19 April 2008.

Museum director Jeremy Hubbard restructured MOTAT in 2005, adding a tier of managers, and reorganising volunteers into 11 divisions, each led by a collection manager. In 2007, the MOTAT tram line was extended to connect the Great North Road and Meola Road sites. An arson attack in 2008 led to a vintage railway carriage being destroyed.

The MOTAT Aviation Display Hall was opened in 2011, extending the existing building to 3,300 m^{2} (36,000 sq ft) in size.

In 2012, a report on MOTAT by museum professional Cheryll Sotheran noted infighting and tension between management, volunteers and Auckland Council. After Michael Frawley was appointed as the CEO of MOTAT in February 2013, Frawley restructured the organisation into three "hubs" (business services, museum experience, and classic collection), increased staff numbers, and led to MOTAT refocusing on "Kiwi ingenuity" - using the historical collection to demonstrate both the past and future of New Zealand technology.

In 2023, MOTAT converted its 1891 Baldwin steam tram from coal to use biofuel.

Te Puawānanga Science and Technology Centre was opened at MOTAT in May 2024, as a science space designed for teachers, families and children. The centre, composed of three gallery spaces and three classrooms, focuses on learning through play and exploration, Mātauranga Māori, and relationships with the environment. The centre won the International Exhibition of the Year at the Museums + Heritage Awards in 2025.

In 2025, the Auckland Council voted to increase funding to MOTAT.

== Governance and funding ==
MOTAT was run directly by the MOTAT Society from 1960 until 1984, when the MOTAT Board of Trustees was established. Since the Museum of Transport and Technology Act 2000 was passed by the New Zealand Government, MOTAT has been run by a ten-member board, featuring six appointees by the Auckland Council and four by the MOTAT Society. The board appoint a chief executive / museum director to manage museum operations. Prior to the museum's official opening in 1964, the chairman of the executive committee fulfilled the duties of museum director.

Originally, MOTAT was funded through memberships, admission fees, donations and volunteer work. MOTAT became partially funded by the Auckland City Council in 1984. From the year 2000, all Auckland local government bodies became required to contribute to the funding of MOTAT due to the Museum of Transport and Technology Act 2000.

=== List of museum directors and chief executives ===
	Name	Term of office	Ref(s)
Director
1	John Hogan	1964–1970	
2	Ron Richardson	1970–1980	
3	Michael Jameson	1980–1983	
4	Rodney Dearing	1984–1994	
Consultant manager
5	Grant Kirby	1994–2000	
Chief Executive/Museum Director
6	John Syme	2000–2001	
7	Jeremy Hubbard	2002–2012	
8	Michael Frawley	2013–2024	
9	Craig Hickman-Goodall	2024–	

== Walsh Memorial Library ==
The Walsh Memorial Library was established in 1964 by members of the Aviation Historical Society of New Zealand, who combined their private document collections to create a library during the establishment of MOTAT. It was originally based on the upper floor of the Western Springs pumphouse, and formally named and established in 1968. During the mid-1970s, the Pearse Medal was created as a means to establish funds for a permanent library building. In 1977, the library moved to its permanent home with the opening of the Pioneers of Aviation building

The library contains books, technical manuals, image collections, oral histories, and archives of several organisations, including the Society of Automotive Engineers, New Zealand National Airways Corporation, Royal Aeronautical Society, New Zealand Railways Corporation and the Auckland Transport Board.

== Collections ==
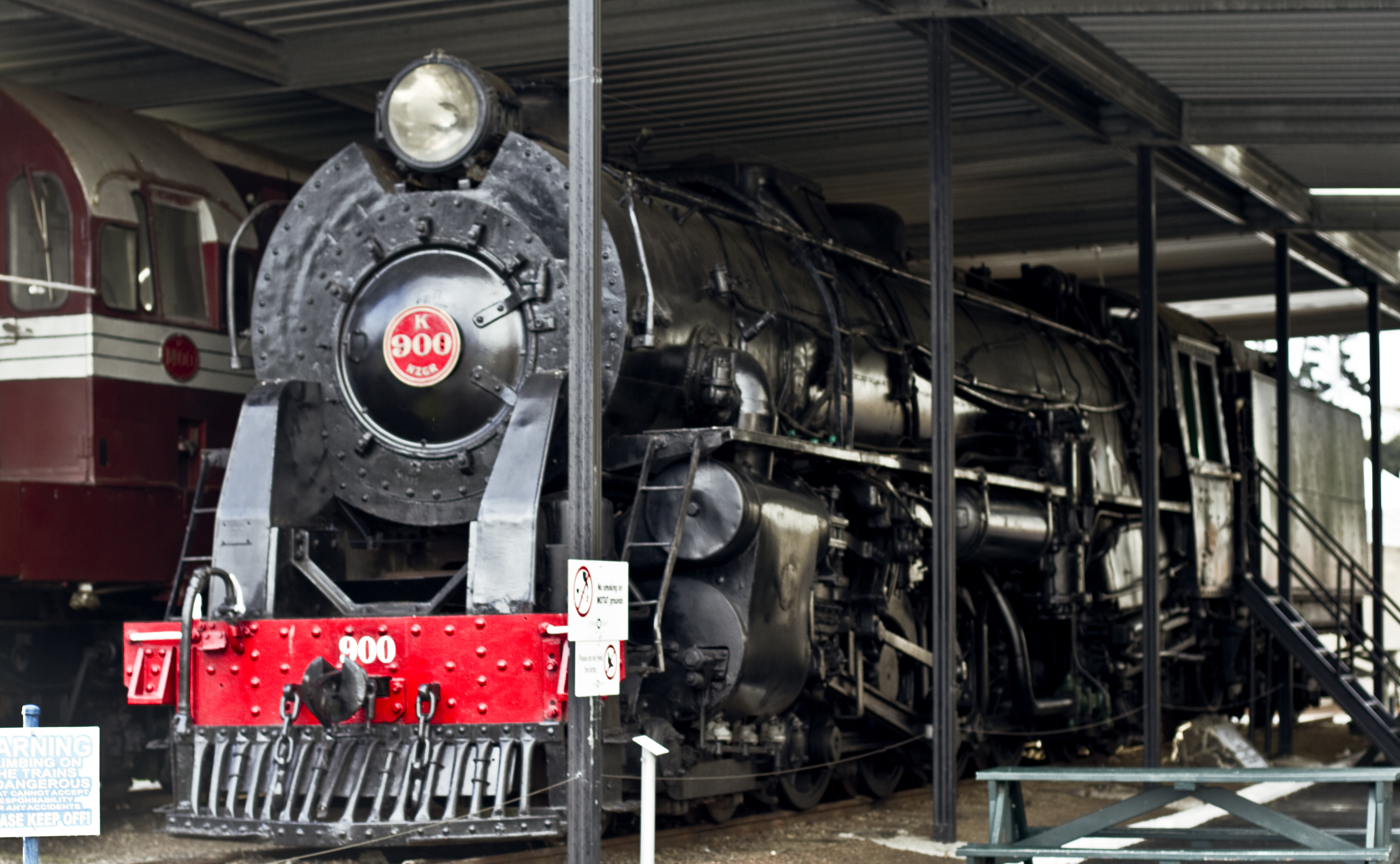
K 900 on static display at MOTAT

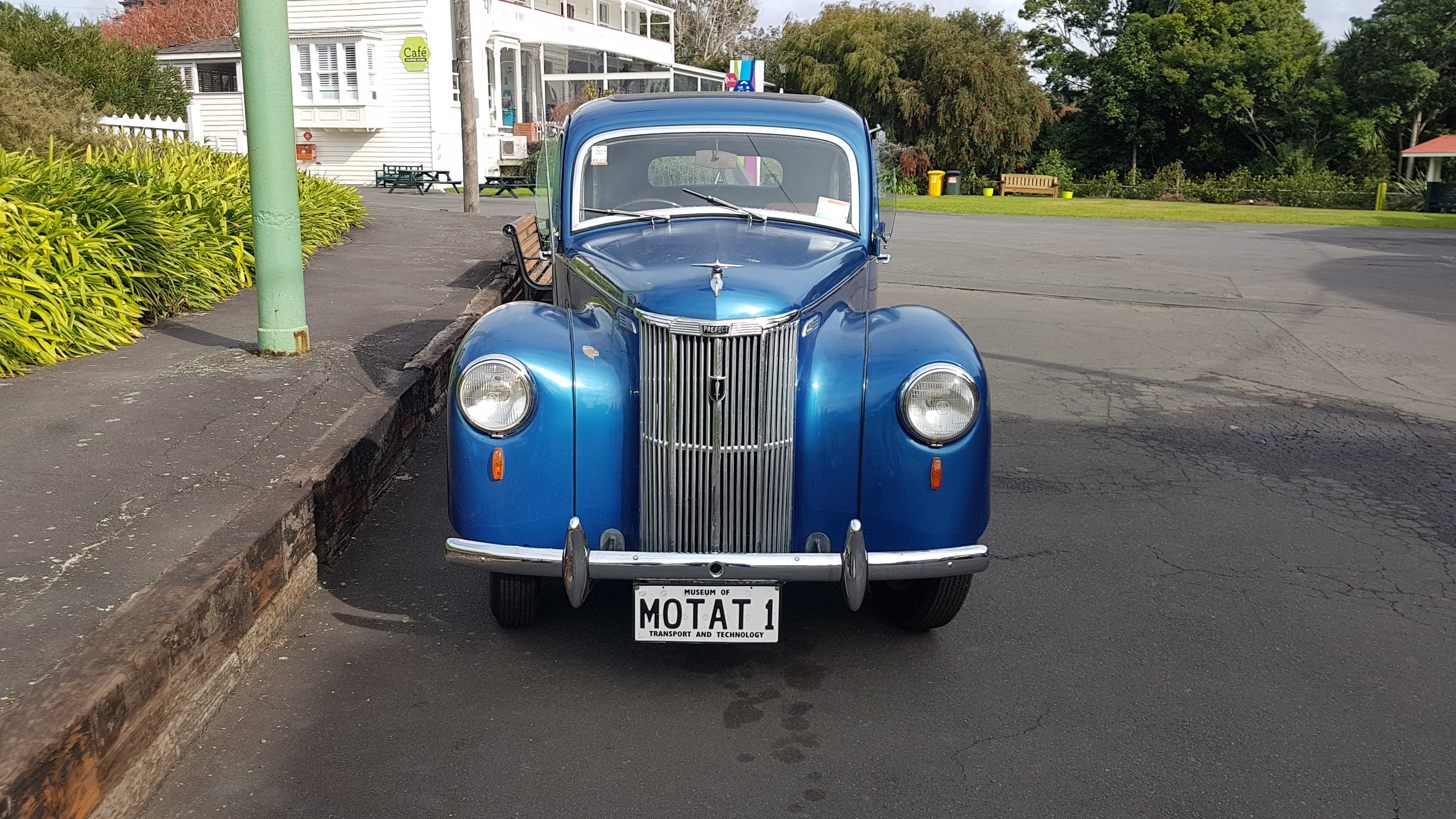
1953 Ford Prefect on display at MOTAT

MOTAT's collections include over 300,000 items. In 2006, an estimated 65% of the collections were in storage. Its aviation collection, named in honour of Keith Park, is of international importance.

MOTAT features several major collections of transport vehicles:

- Aircraft collection – houses one of New Zealand's largest collections of civil and military aircraft, all with genuine New Zealand aviation pedigrees. These range from relics from Richard Pearse's first 1903 aircraft and an interpretive replica, as well as his original third, a vertical takeoff convertiplane. 1930s de Havilland Fox Moth, Tiger Moth and Dragon Rapide, 1940s Short Solent double-decked flying boat from New Zealand's first International Airline, Tasman Empire Airways Limited (TEAL), a Short Sunderland marine patrol flying boat, de Havilland Mosquito wooden fighter bomber, a restored 1940s Avro Lancaster bomber, Douglas Dakota through to a de Havilland Vampire 1950s jet fighter and most recently former RNZAF Douglas A-4 Skyhawk and Aermacchi MB-339CB advanced jet trainers. The aviation site of MOTAT located in Meola Road is also known as the Keith Park Memorial Airfield. A replica Hawker Hurricane is on a plinth in the markings OK-1 of New Zealander and RAF Air Chief Marshal Keith Park memorial at the entrance.
- Railway locomotives and collection – includes seven steam locomotives from a pioneering 1874 NZR F class to the iconic NZR K class steam locomotive, smaller branch line, industrial and logging tank locomotives. Also six diesel, petrol and petrol electric locomotives, including the DA class which was built to replace the K class from the 1950s through the 1960s and became the most prolific mainline locomotive in New Zealand. This is operational and able to be viewed on Live Days which occur every third Sunday of the month. Also included in this collection is a 1910 Tangye steam engine, and a 1911 triple-expansion engine built by Campbell Calderwood from Paisley, Scotland, which was formerly from the ill-fated Sydney Ferry Greycliffe which sank on 3 November 1927 after being hit by the much larger Union Steam Ship Company's Royal Mail Steamship Tahiti with the loss of 40 lives. The engine ended its commercial life in the Tīrau dairy factory. Steam for the Beam Engine and other artifacts provided by a 1957 Daniel Adamson steam boiler, which was formerly used at Frankham's Mill, Te Puna.
- Railway carriages – the collection also includes stations, carriages, wagons and other rolling stock.
- Tram collection – the collection includes over 20 electric, steam and cable trams, many of which are operational, with support equipment and vehicles from former New Zealand tramway systems of Auckland, Wellington, Wanganui and the Mornington Cable tram system in Dunedin. Auckland's horse-drawn tramway opened in 1884 and was replaced by the electric tram system in 1902, closing in 1956. The final closure of an original street tramway was in Wellington in 1964. An 1883 Dunedin Cable Car trailer is the sole South Island tramway exhibit and there are additional trams from Melbourne and Sydney, Australia. Street furniture used on the Auckland Tramways can be seen on the Western Springs Tramway including traction pole skirts and cast iron pillar boxes dating from the 1900s, concrete safety zones, platform information signs, Cincinnati Recording Clocks, Queen Street Dispatchers Cabin all dating from the 1920s and some used into the trolleybus era. The museum is one of five operational Museum and Heritage Tramways in New Zealand.
- Petrol / diesel bus collection – contains a significant collection of historic buses from the Auckland region, including a 1924 White Motor Company 4-cylinder side-valve petrol engine, wooden-bodied 23 seat omnibus, through a 1954 Bedford SB, petrol engine, 35-seat lightweight wooden-body bus specifically built for Grafton Bridge services, through to a 1978 M.A.N SL200 No.1603 retired in the 2010s.
- Trolleybus collection – this collection contains a representative cross-section of trolleybuses which operated in Auckland between 1938 and 1980. First used on a 1 km department store-operated route in central Auckland from 1938, the trolleybus system later duplicated and then replaced the aging tram system between 1949 and 1956. The trolleybuses were in turn replaced by diesel buses in 1980.
- Road transport collection – rotationally displays in excess of 100 cars, trucks, motorbikes and emergency vehicles. Some of the iconic vehicles in the collection include one of the first Trekka utility vehicles, New Zealand's only homegrown production vehicle built between 1966 and 1973, based on Czechoslovak Škoda engines and chassis. Other vehicles include a 1960s Cooper Climax race car, an early American Brush Motor Car Company runabout, an International horseless carriage, an Austin Motor Company beer tanker (the first in New Zealand) and a wide number of other vehicles. Also in the collection is one of the Ferguson Company tractors which Edmund Hillary used to lay supply depots for the Commonwealth Trans-Antarctic Expedition, and with which he beat British explorer Dr Vivian Fuchs Sno-Cats to the South Pole on 3 January 1958. MOTAT also houses a small collection of Police vehicles, including former New Zealand Transport Department, later New Zealand Ministry of Transport (M.O.T.) patrol cars and patrol motorbikes, the road policing duties of which were combined into the New Zealand Police in the early 1990s. The NZ Police Collection of 40 plus vehicles were housed at MOTAT for a number of years until 2011.
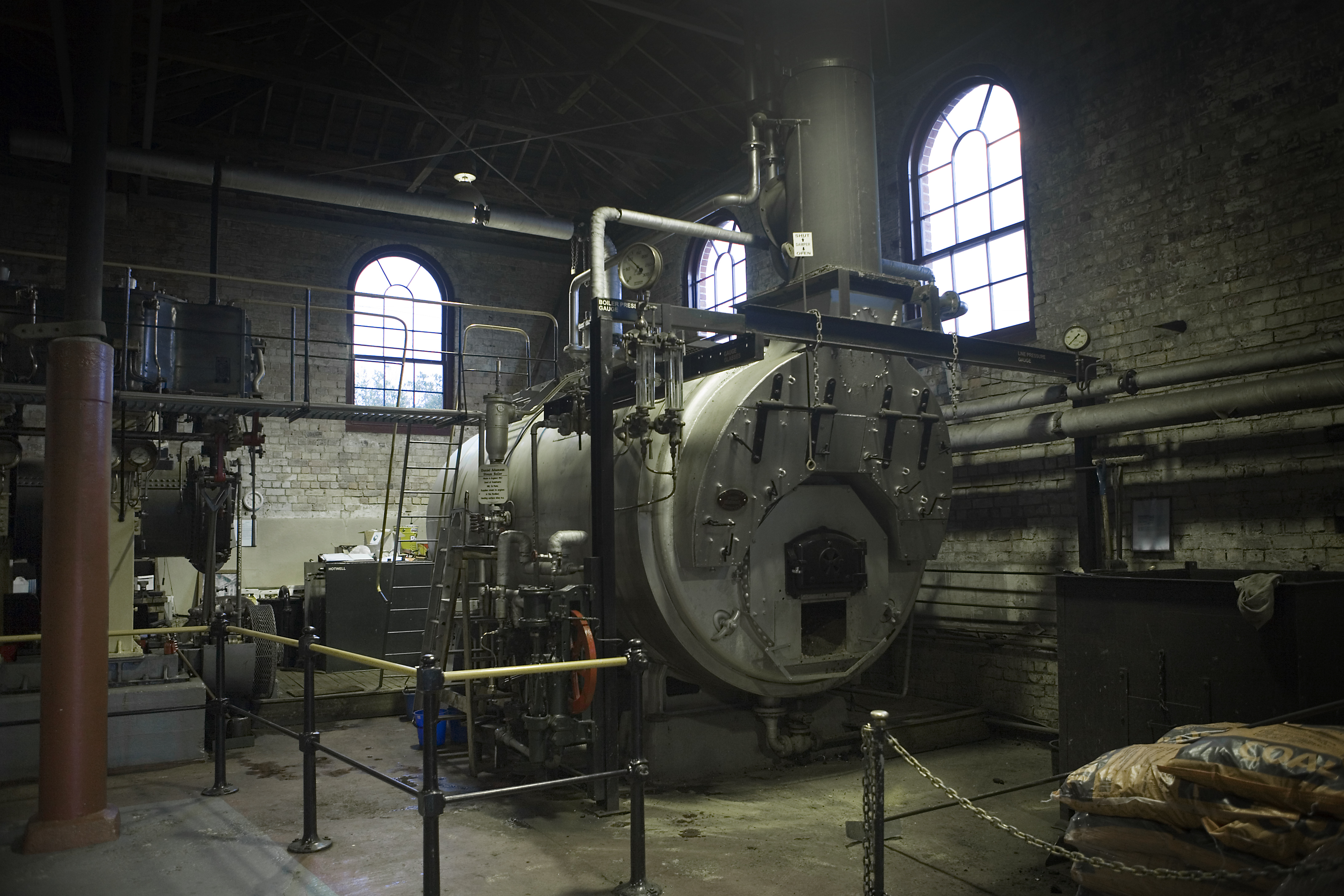
Coal boiler room

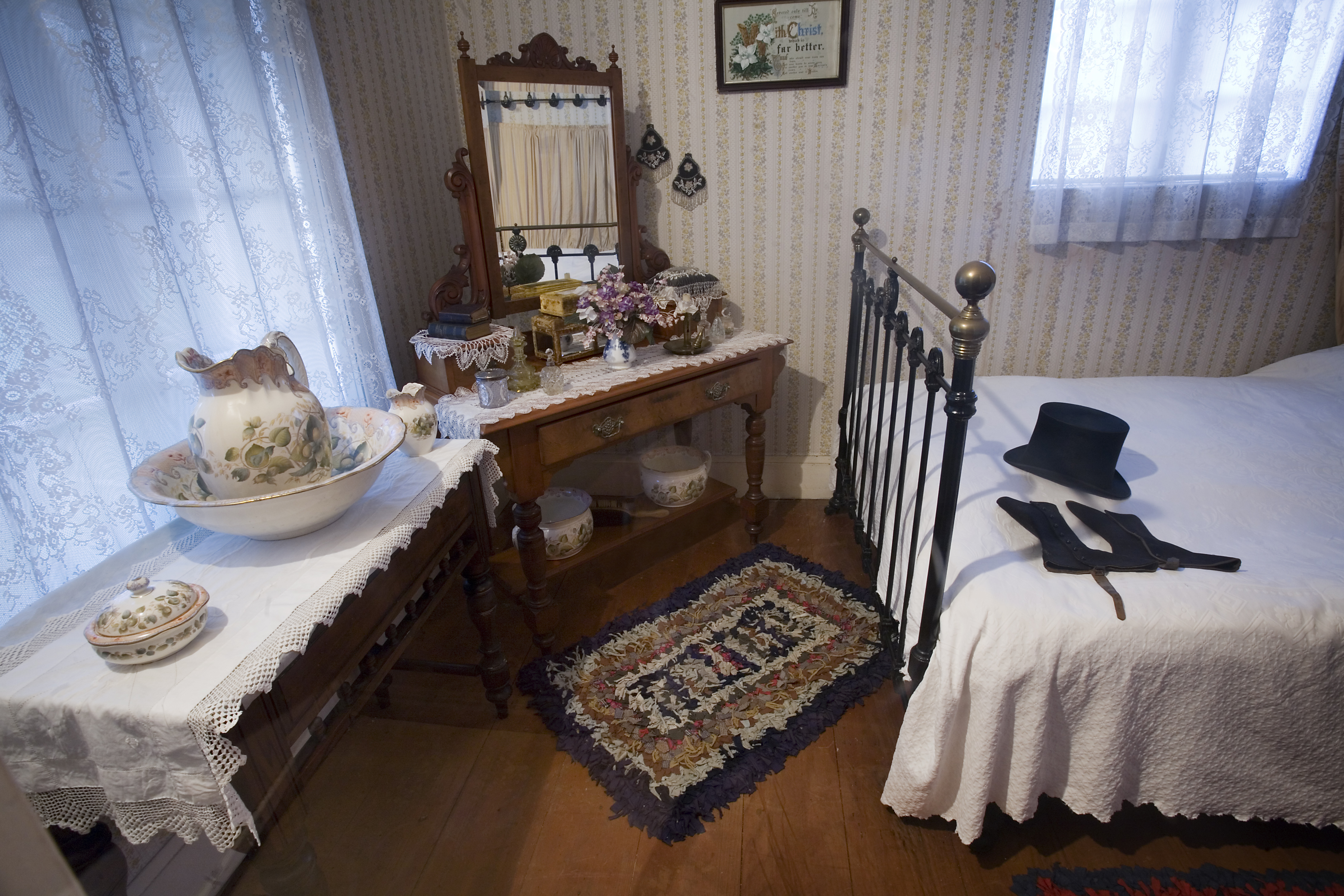
19th century bedroom

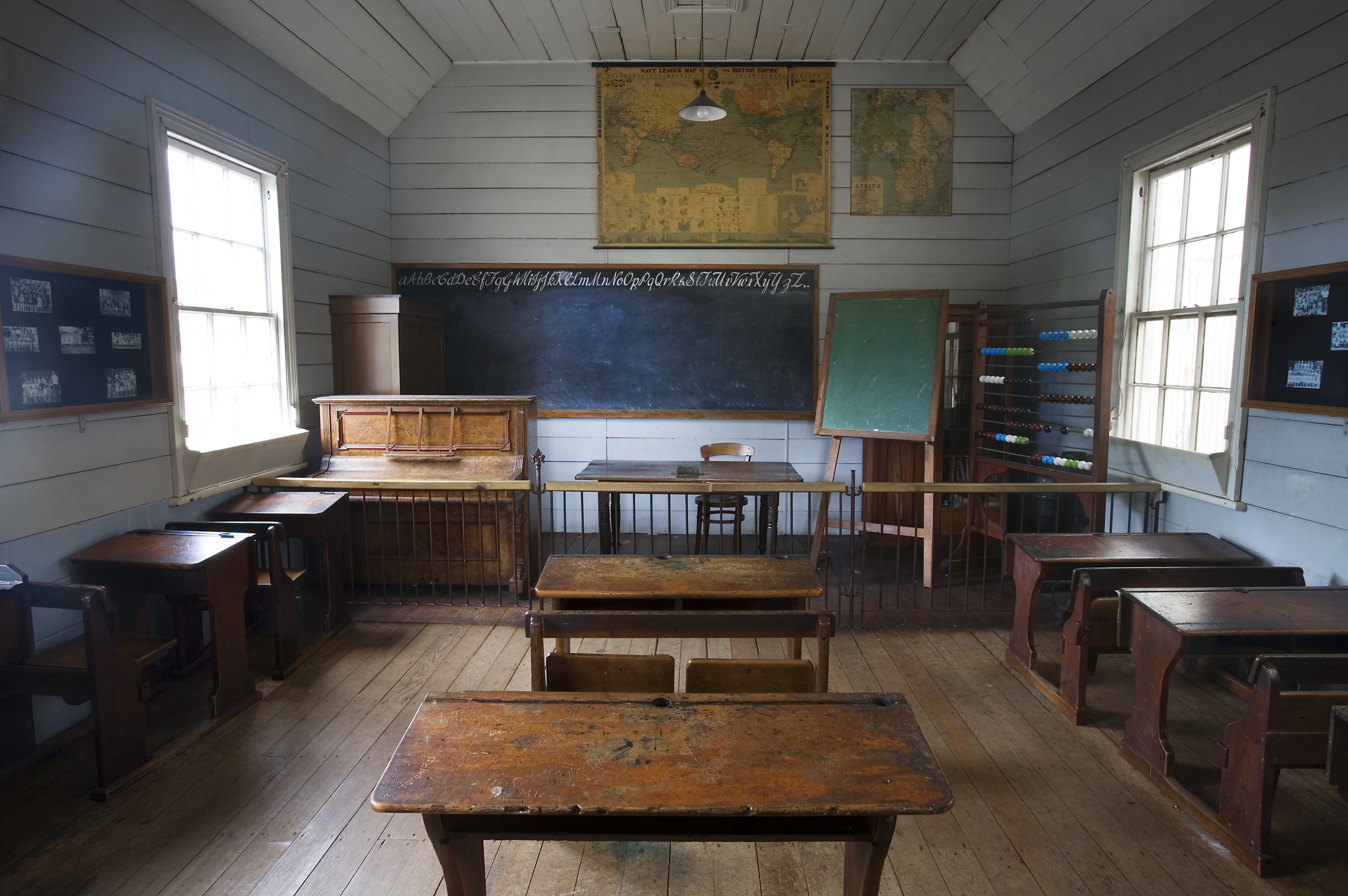
Wainui School classroom

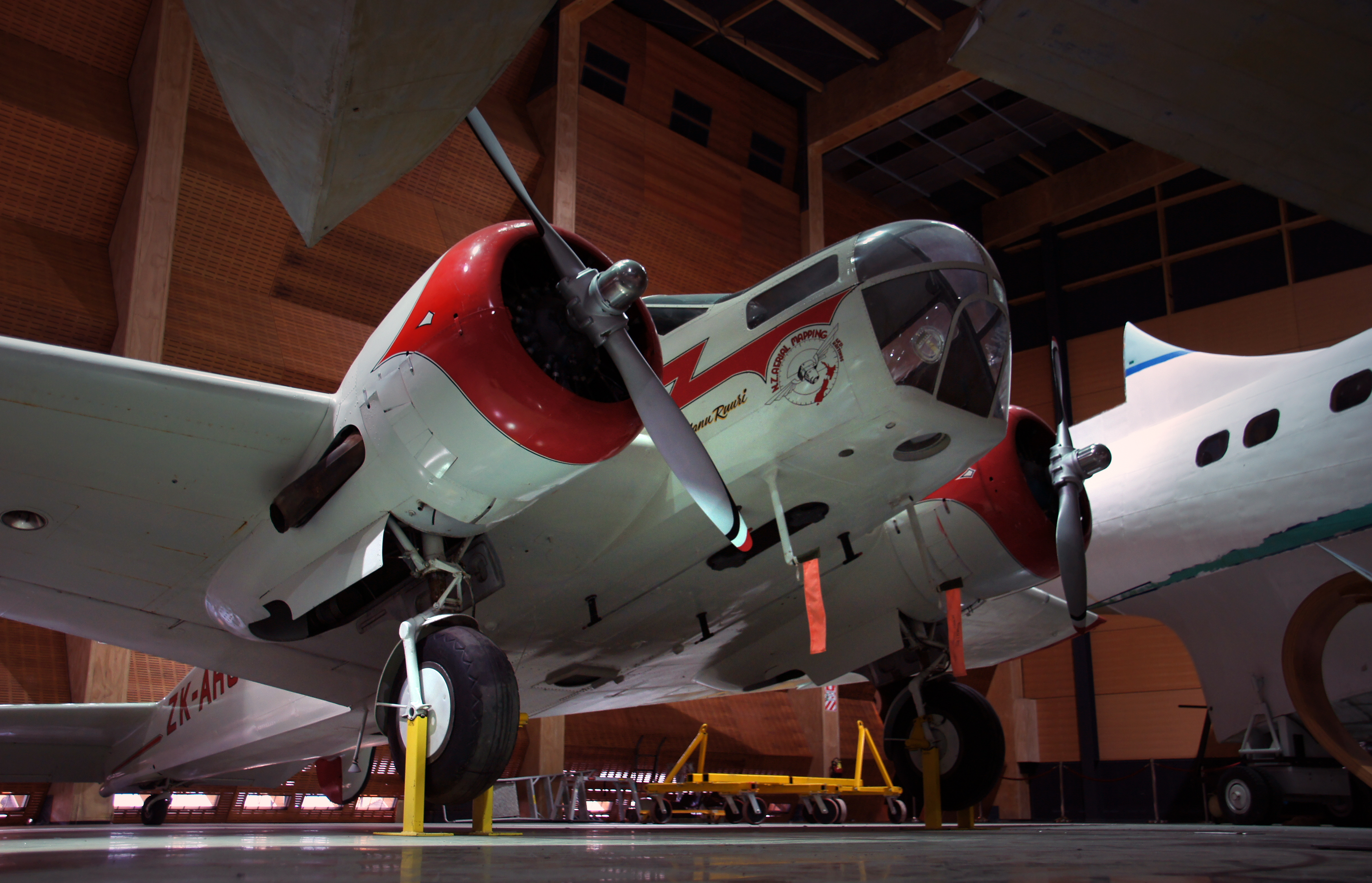
Beechcraft AT-11

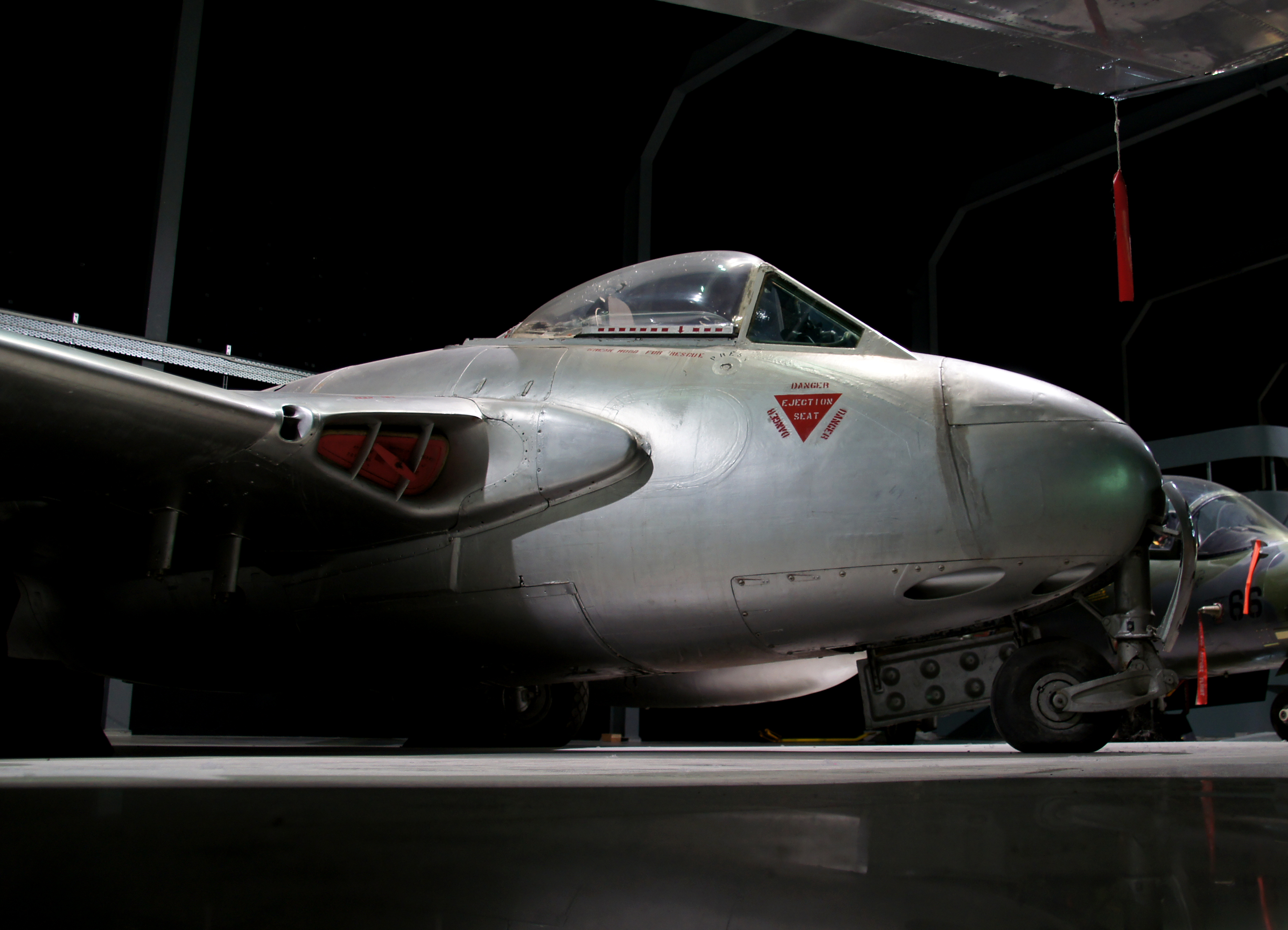
De Havilland DH.100 Vampire

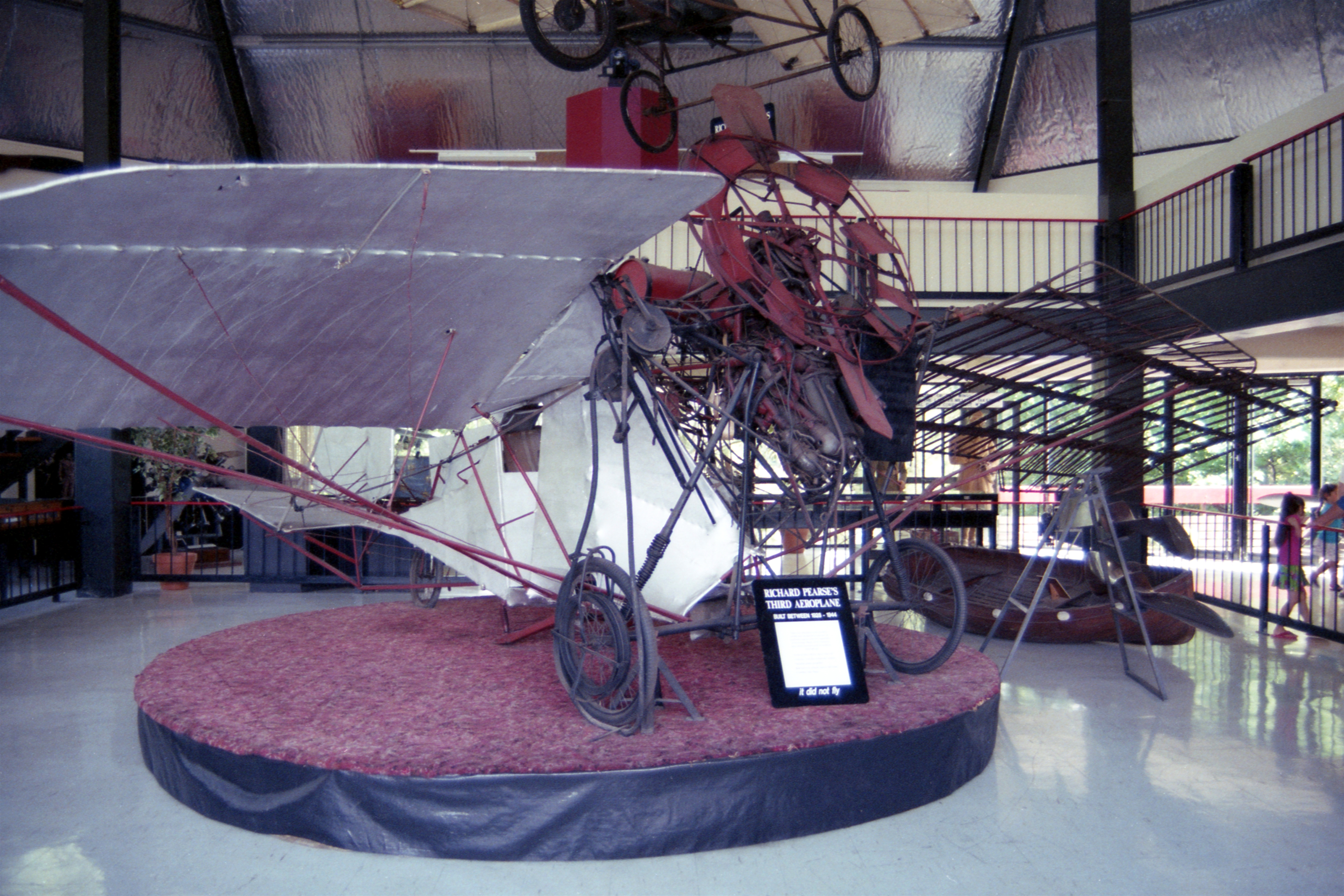
Richard Pearse's third airplane

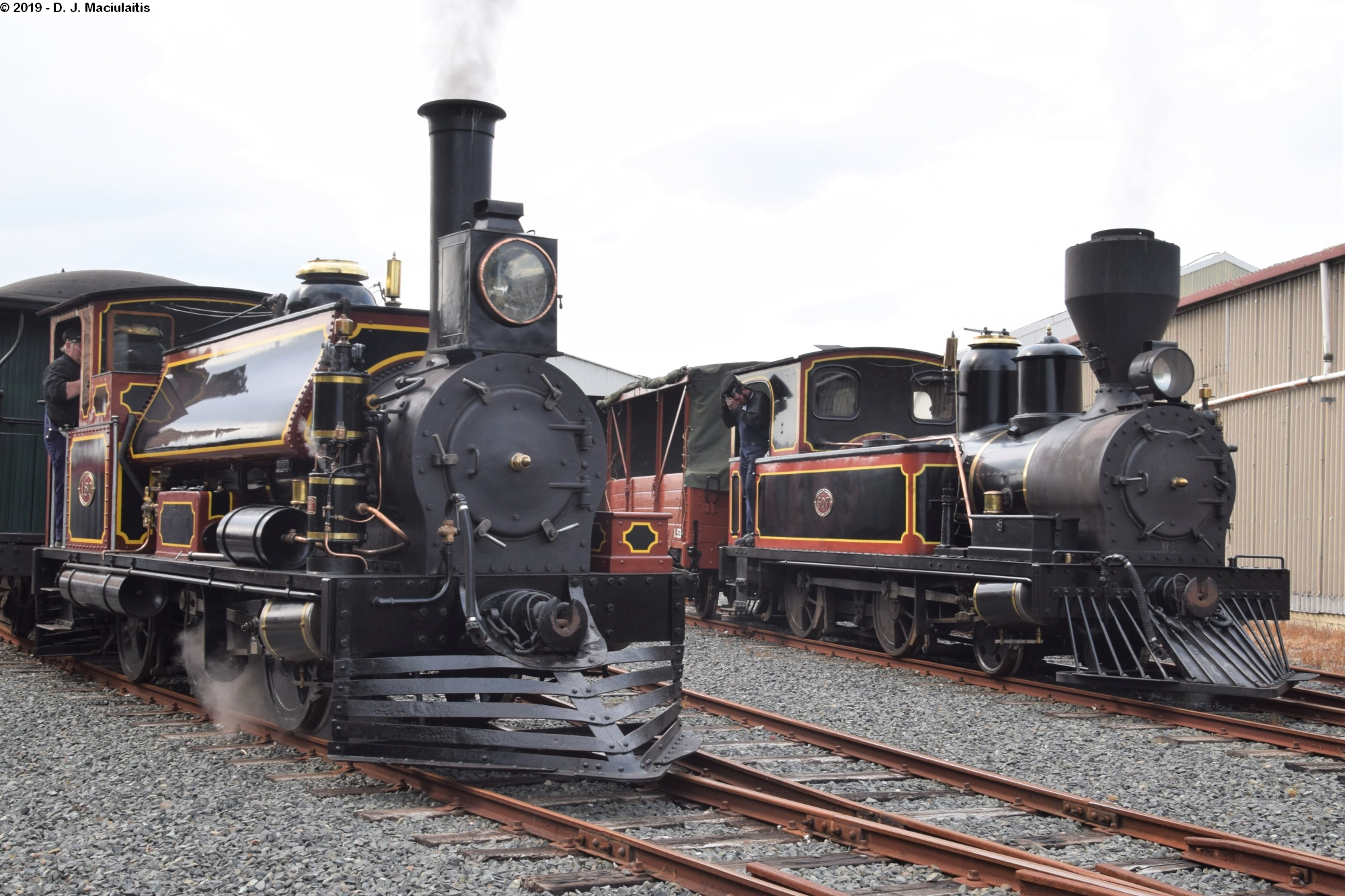
Steam locomotives

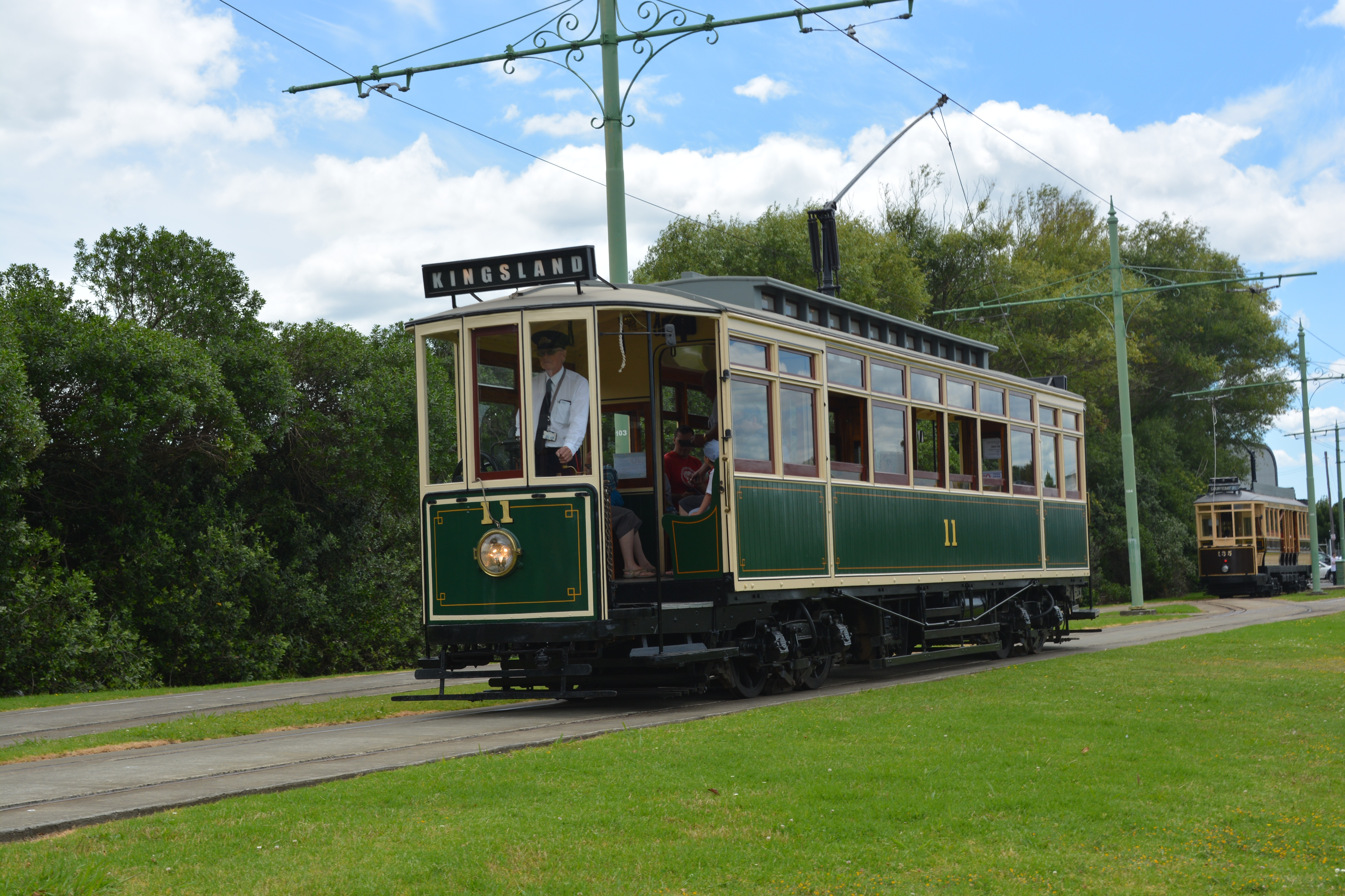
Two working trams

== Bibliography ==
- Cresswell, John (1976). MOTAT Museum of Transport and Technology of New Zealand Inc. Auckland: Paul Hamlyn. ISBN 0600074234.
- Penney, Janelle (2006). MOTAT: Moving History: The Museum of Transport and Technology. Auckland: Bush Press Communications. ISBN 0-473-11128-4.
- Wrigley, Philip; Croker, Richard; Millar, Sean (2014). MOTAT Locomotives: The Locomotive Collection of Auckland's Museum of Transport & Technology. Auckland: Sean Millar Publishing. ISBN 978-0-908726-92-9.
