= Motions Creek =

Creek in Auckland, New Zealand

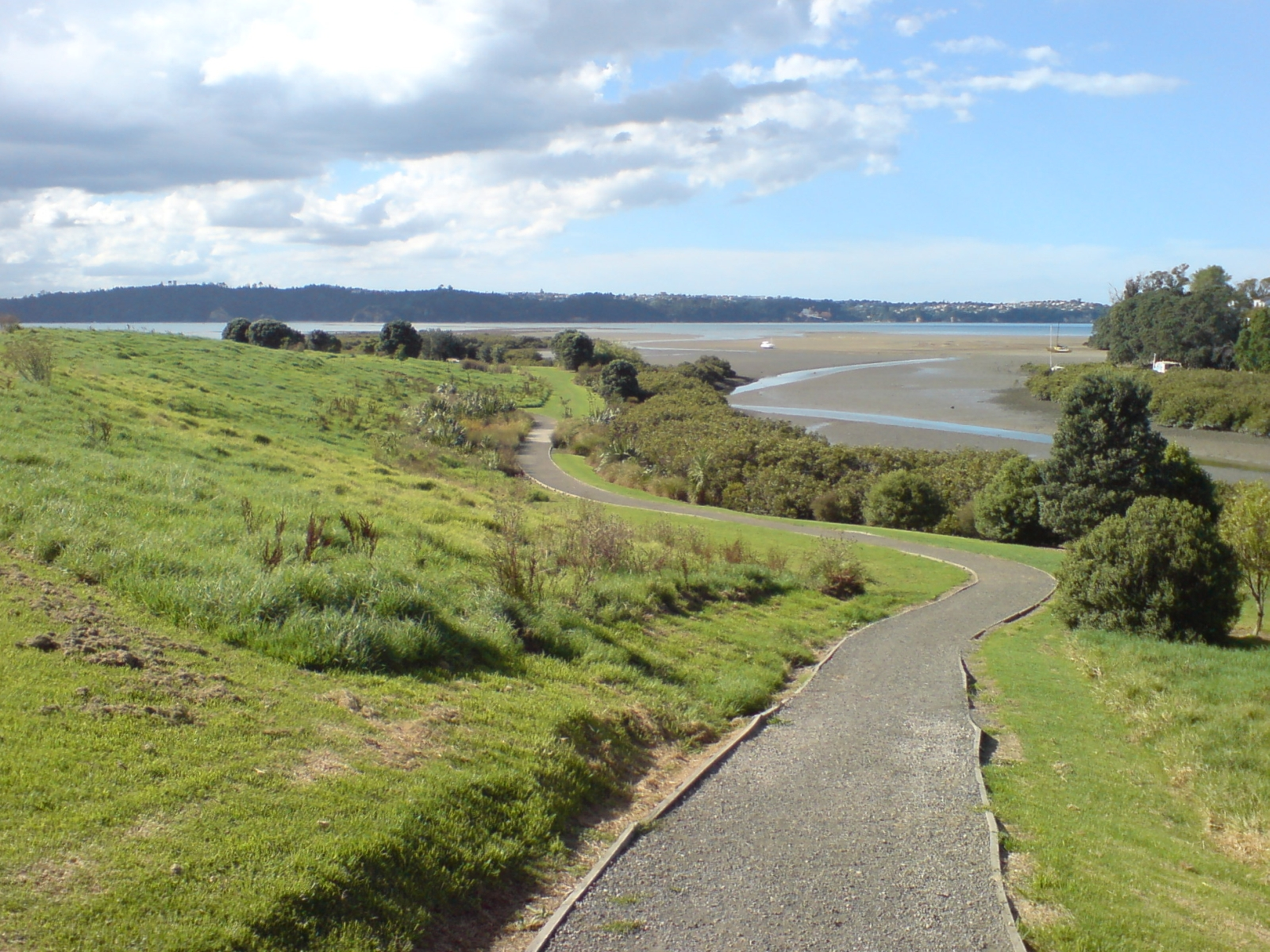
- Mouth of the Motions Creek, seen from the Meola Reef

- Mouth of the Motions Creek Motions Creek (New Zealand)
- Route of the Motions Creek
- Native name: Māori: Waiateao, Waiorea

Location
- Country: New Zealand
- Region: Auckland Region

Physical characteristics
- Source
  - location: Western Springs Reserve
  - coordinates: 36.86681°S 174.72635°E
- Mouth: Waitematā Harbour
  - coordinates: 36.85435°S 174.71195°E

Basin features
- Progression: Motions Creek → Waitematā Harbour → Hauraki Gulf → Pacific Ocean
- Bridges: Motions Road Bridge, Meola Road Bridge

Motions Creek (Māori: Waiateao or Māori: Waiorea) is a creek in Auckland, New Zealand. It flows northwards from Western Springs Reserve on the Auckland isthmus, entering the Waitematā Harbour to the east of Meola Reef.

== Geography ==
The creek originates at Western Springs Reserve, flowing northwards through the suburb of Western Springs, adjacent to Westmere. The creek flows into the Waitematā Harbour to the east of Meola Reef, parallel to Meola Creek, which flows into the Waitematā Harbour to the west of the reef. The lower tidal sections of the creek are bordered by mangrove forests.

The Motions Creek catchment spans an area of 544 hectares (1,340 acres) of Auckland, beginning from northern Maungawhau / Mount Eden and including the suburbs of Eden Terrace, Morningside, Arch Hill, Kingsland, parts of southern Grey Lynn, and western Westmere. The majority of the upper reaches of the catchment are piped, with the stream visible as it flows through Western Springs Reserve and the Auckland Zoo. Prior to the construction of the lake at Western Springs, the area was a natural freshwater aquifer, where water comes through the surface through cracks in basalt lava flow from Te Tātua a Riukiuta.

== History ==
The Tāmaki Māori names associated with the stream are Waiorea ("Waters of the Eels"), associated with Western Springs Reserve, and Waiateao. The kāinga Te Rehu, dating to the 1820s, was located beside the creek estuary.

In 1846, Scottish settler William Motion established Low and Motion's Four Mill on the banks of the creek, which operated until 1875. During the early colonial period, the creek was known as Mill Creek, eventually becoming known as Motions Creek, after William Motion. In the 1870s, the Auckland City Council purchased Motion's property, establishing an artificial lake on the creek, and constructing the Western Springs Pumping Station, which operated from 1877.

The Motions landfill operated adjacent to the stream between 1930 and 1972.

== Gallery ==
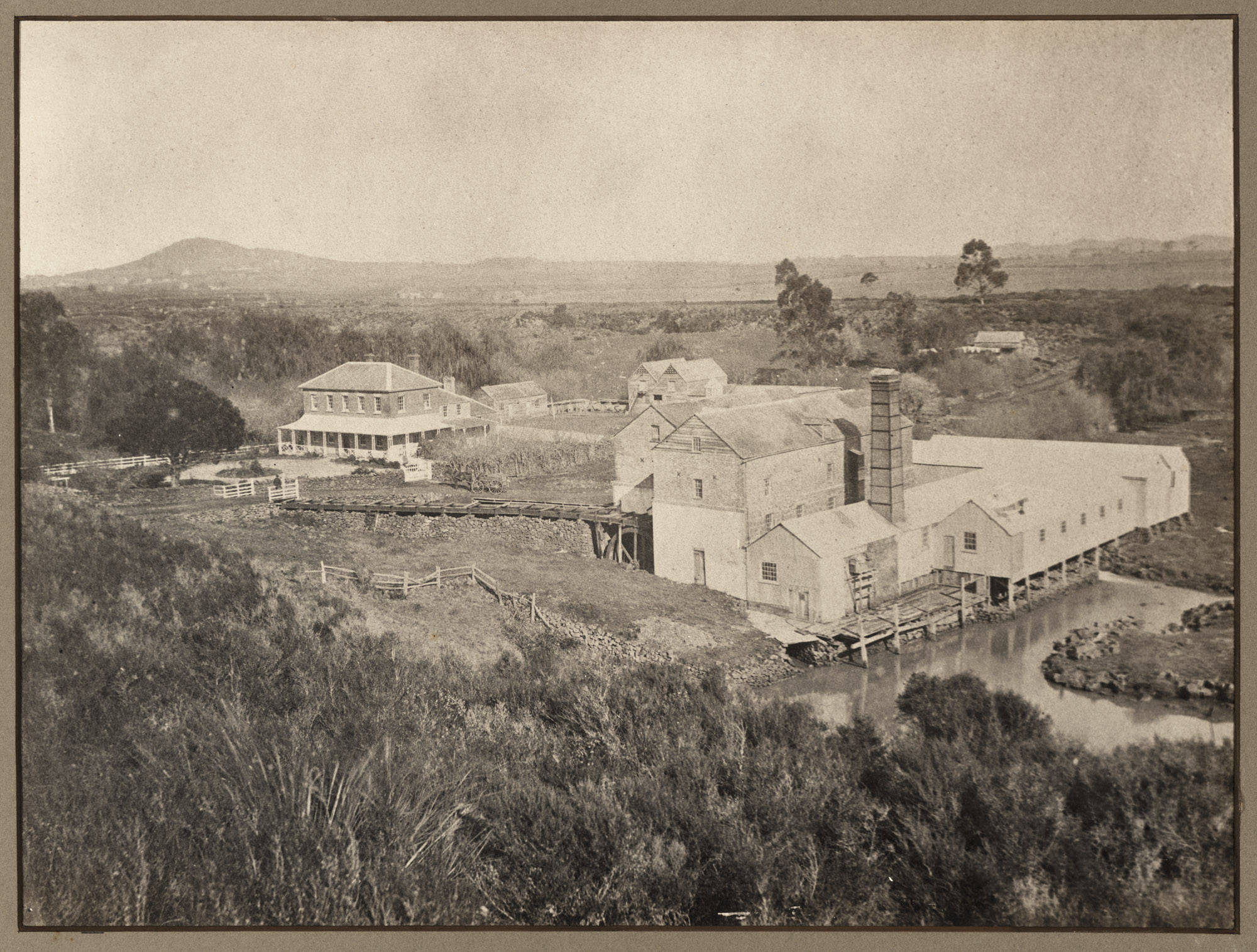
Low and Motions' Flour Mill on the banks of the Motions Creek, c. 1870s.

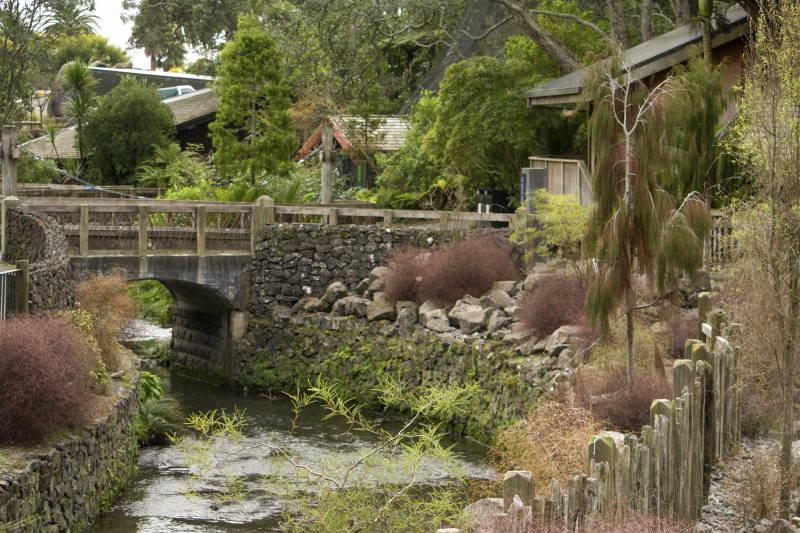
Motions Creek at Auckland Zoo

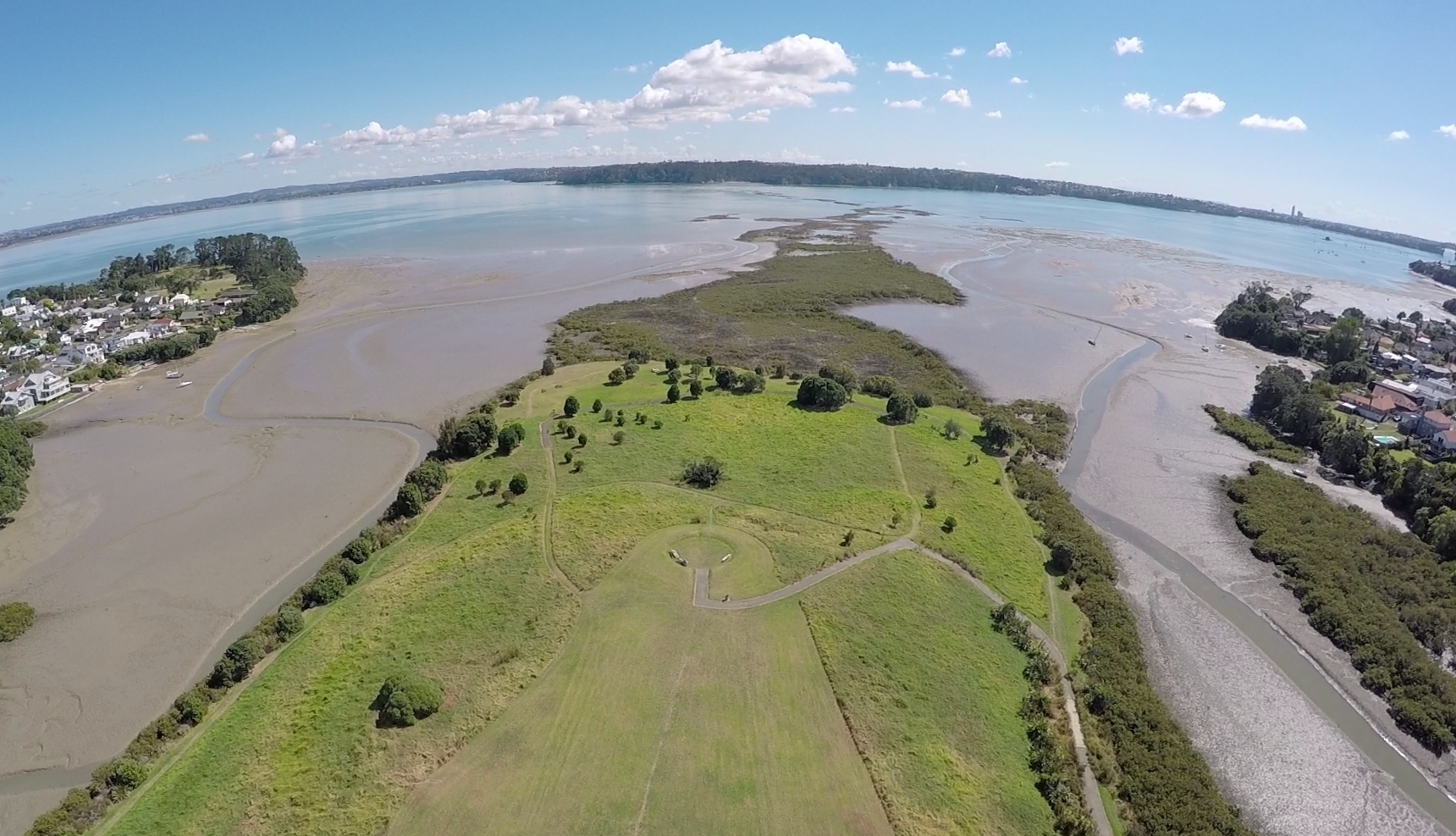
Aerial view of Meola Reef, with Meola Creek to the left and Motions Creek to the right
