= Jin (otter) =

Individual otter in New Zealand

- Species: Aonyx cinereus
- Sex: Female
- Born: 2001 or 2002; Auckland Zoo
- Died: 16 August 2010; Wellington Zoo
- Nationality: New Zealand
- Known for: Escaping Auckland Zoo

Jin (2001 or 2002–2010) was an Asian small-clawed otter who escaped from New Zealand's Auckland Zoo in 2006. She was captured almost a month later on Rangitoto Island, in the Hauraki Gulf, after swimming an estimated 20 kilometres, and was returned to the zoo. She was born in Auckland Zoo, was moved to Willowbank Wildlife Reserve in Christchurch in 2006, and was moved again to Wellington Zoo in 2007. She died in 2010.

== Zoo escape ==
Jin escaped Auckland Zoo on 13 June 2006 because a nesting box was not adequately attached to an enclosure wall. To escape, she dug through two walls and climbed over a 1.8-metre barrier. Two other otters also escaped but they were captured at the zoo. In an attempt to attract her, recordings of otter sounds were played. A dog was used to search through streets neighbouring the zoo, as well as Jaggers Bush and Meola Creek. At the time, conservationists were concerned about the possibility of Jin entering Tiritiri Matangi Island, which is home to endangered species such as the takahē, as she might have preyed upon them. She swam to the Chelsea Sugar Refinery and then to the suburb of Devonport, which is about 10 kilometres away from the zoo and a 5.6 kilometre swim across the Waitematā Harbour. Authorities placed traps containing seafood, meat and eggs in the suburb, but they did not work. She was sighted at Narrow Neck beach. There were also reported sightings at Whangārei Heads and the Tāmaki River, although it is believed that this was a seal and a shag, respectively. On 9 July a sailor in the Hauraki Gulf spotted her and she was seen leaving a small cave. Food was placed around traps in the islands of the gulf.

She was found on 10 July in a wire cage trap on Rangitoto Island or Motutapu Island (sources vary) after being on the loose for a little under a month. The trap had a piece of mutton in it. She had a few cuts and it was believed that she had swum up to 20 kilometres. The Department of Conservation spent about $2000 on capturing Jin. She lost about a third of her bodyweight and was kept in quarantine for a month after being captured. The media covered the escape almost daily. Some newspaper headlines included otter puns, for example "Trail gets otter as Jin spotted on Rangitoto", "Come home Jin you really otter", "Elusive Jin still on otter side of town" and "She otter be back at zoo". While she was still loose, people on the Internet were sharing a recipe for a Swimming Jin cocktail recipe: gin, cucumber and pomegranate and the National Distribution Union made bumper stickers that said that finding Jin was easier than finding a good wage.

== Life ==
Jin was born in Auckland Zoo in 2001 or 2002. She was moved in August 2006 to Christchurch's Willowbank Wildlife Reserve with the hope that she would procreate with an otter named Jala. Jin and Jala were moved to Wellington Zoo in November 2007 and were kept in quarantine for a month before the public could see them. In January 2009 they were moved to a new home at the zoo. In 2010, Jin was introduced to an otter named Bud with the intention that they would breed, but they never produced any pups. Jin was found dead on 16 August 2010 in her enclosure. Stuff ranked Jin as one of their "Top 10 animal heart-warmers" in 2011 and The New Zealand Herald listed Jin as one of the "animals whose fates have gripped the nation" in 2021.
