= Meola Creek =

Creek in Auckland, New Zealand

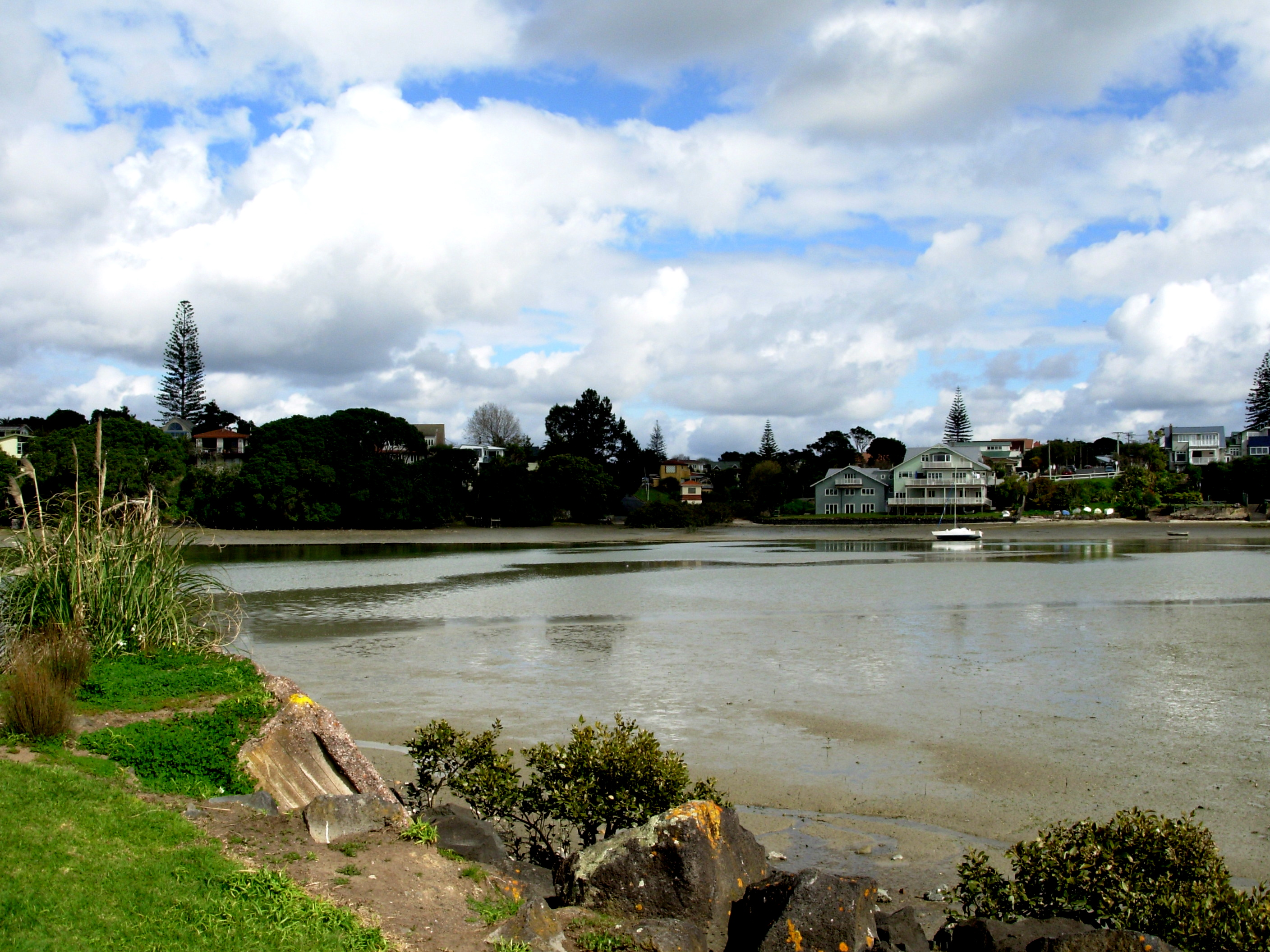
- The mouth of the Meola Creek, looking towards Point Chevalier from the Meola Reef

- Mouth of the Meola Creek Meola Creek (New Zealand)
- Route of the Meola Creek

Location
- Country: New Zealand
- Region: Auckland Region

Physical characteristics
- Source
  - location: Hampstead Road, Sandringham
  - coordinates: 36.891667°S 174.727778°E
- Mouth: Waitematā Harbour
  - coordinates: 36.852778°S 174.708056°E

Meola Creek is a waterway in Auckland, New Zealand. It is situated in Integrated Catchment Area #1 within Auckland City's drainage network. The catchment consists largely of a natural valley that runs down from the north-east slopes of Mt Albert (Owairaka), north of Mt Albert Road. The upper section of Meola Creek flows along the boundary of the Western Springs College and through the Kerr-Taylor Reserve. The area around the creek is subject to a combination of residential, commercial and recreational activities, which result in the stream being entirely piped upstream of the Chamberlain Park Golf Course, and strongly contaminated with urban pollutants such as zinc and lead.

Meola Creek drains into an estuarine area of the mid-Waitematā Harbour, on a low-lying part of the Auckland isthmus. This receiving environment has one of the longest histories of urbanisation in the Auckland region. The area around the estuary is actually a natural flood plain, much of which has been converted to parks and playing fields. A good portion of the mangrove forest remains intact. Te Tokaroa (Meola Reef) next to Point Chevalier forms the northern part of a 10-kilometre (6 mi) long lava flow that originated from Mount Saint John volcano and flowed down a narrow creek valley. The reef extends for over 2 kilometres (1.2 mi) across the Waitematā Harbour

== History ==
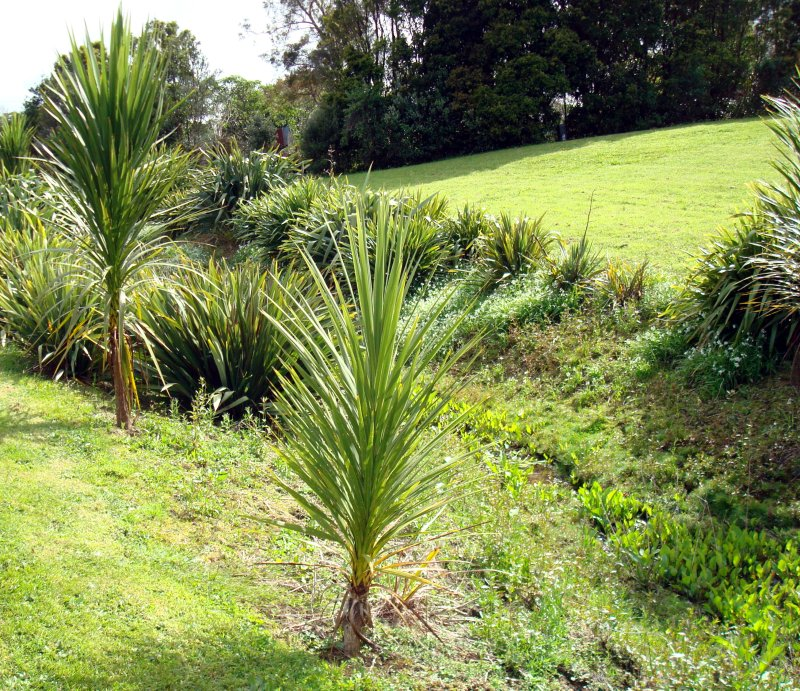
The start of Meola Creek

Tāmaki Māori people named the creek Waitītiko, meaning "water of the periwinkles". The creek was traditionally used for eel fishing by Tāmaki Māori. European settlers subsequently renamed it Meola Creek, possibly after a glacier in India where Allan Kerr Taylor was born and lived until aged eight. The Kerr Taylor family lived near the source of Meola Creek in a large Indian-influenced house called Alberton, one of the most loved historic houses in New Zealand. In pre-human times much of the area was wetlands; in fact, the nearby suburb of Sandringham used to be called Cabbage Tree Swamp up until the mid 19th century. Following European settlement, most of the area around the creek remained as gorse-covered swamp until it was finally drained and converted into school playing fields in 1953.

In June 2006 an Asiatic short-clawed otter called Jin made national news as it escaped from Auckland Zoo by swimming down Meola Creek on an outgoing tide and into the Waitematā Harbour. The fugitive otter was later captured on Motutapu Island in Auckland's Hauraki Gulf.

== Threats ==
Recent chemical and biological analyses carried out on water quality and sediment indicate Meola Creek is in a poor condition. Channelization and pollution have taken a hefty toll on its biota and fundamental hydrology. Pollutants such as heavy metals and petrochemicals enter the creek via several stormwater drains along the creek. Because it is situated in a heavily urbanised catchment there are high percentages of impervious surfaces such as roads, carparks and buildings (estimated at 94% of the total catchment area) - all ideal media for the flow of contaminants into urban waterways The creek also receives significant amounts of sediments via the drainage of excess groundwater from the school playing fields as well as slips caused by erosion. During high rainfall events the combined sewage-stormwater drain often overflows, discharging raw human excrement directly into the creek.

The problems, however, are not confined to the creek - within the Meola Reef settling zone (in the Waitematā Harbour), both zinc and lead have exceeded alert levels, which means the benthic community (e.g., shellfish and other sediment-dwelling invertebrates) has been seriously impacted. Heavy metals such as zinc can persist in the aquatic environment for considerable periods of time, particularly in sediment. As a consequence, metals can accumulate in the tissue of benthic organisms and their predators at higher trophic levels. Zinc has been shown to be toxic to aquatic plants and animals. In fish, waterborne zinc can disturb ionic regulation, disrupt gill tissues and cause hypoxia. How much of this can attributed to historical industrial pollution is not known. What is known, however, is that there has been a significant increase of zinc entering this receiving environment since the 1950s – the time when galvanized paint started to be used on rooftops within this increasingly urbanised catchment. In particular, industrial roofs have been found to have zinc levels significantly greater than other urban sources.
