= Ford Prefect =

Ford Prefect may refer to:

- Ford Prefect (car), line of British cars produced between 1938 and 1961
- Ford Prefect (character), character in The Hitchhiker's Guide to the Galaxy
