= Western Springs Pumping Station =

Historic waterworks of Auckland, New Zealand

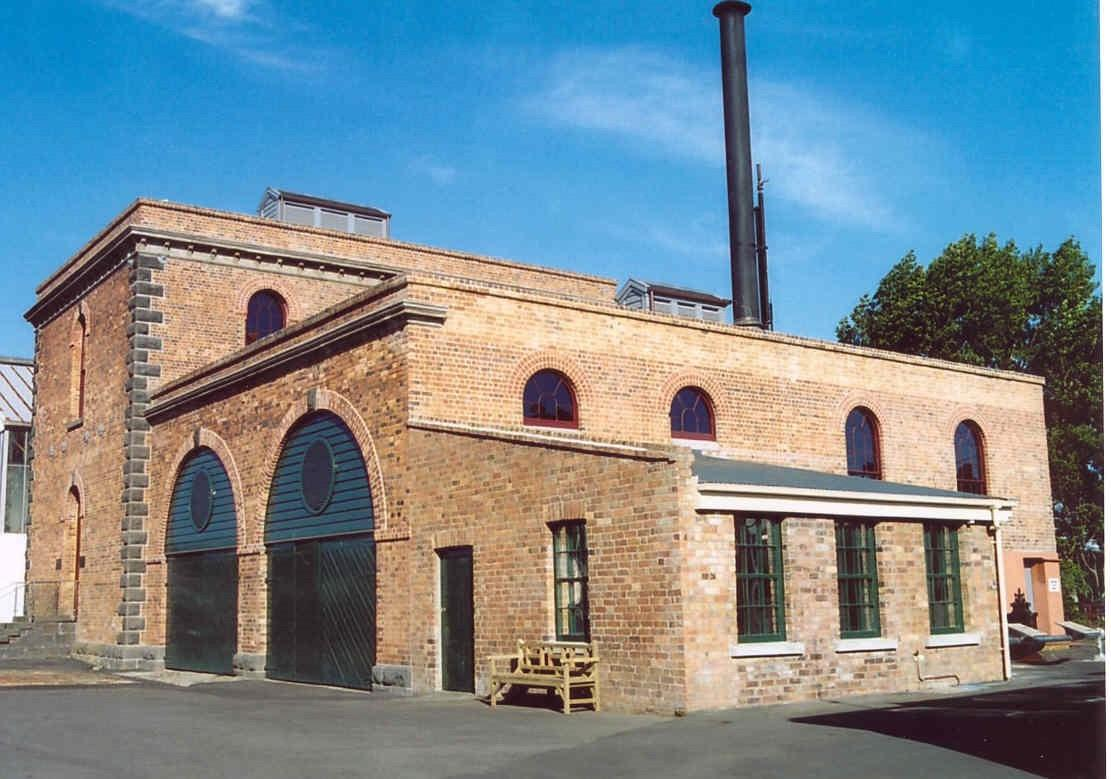
- Interactive map of Western Springs Pumping Station
- Location: Te Wai Ōrea / Western Springs, Auckland, New Zealand
- Coordinates: 36.8676°S 174.7266°E
- Built: 1875–1877
- Built for: Auckland City Council
- Architect: William Errington
- Governing body: Museum of Transport and Technology (MOTAT)

Heritage New Zealand – Category 1
- Designated: 2 July 1987
- Reference no.: 114

The Western Springs Pumping Station, located in the Auckland suburb of Western Springs, was constructed between March 1875 and March 1877. It was formally opened by the Auckland City Council on 10 July 1877. The pumping station was commissioned by the Auckland City Council to pump water for Auckland's first major public water supply system. A twin beam engine, supplied with steam by four Lancashire boilers, was housed in brick buildings. The pumping station remained in regular use until the late 1920s when the Auckland water supply was shifted to a series of dams in the Waitākere Ranges. The station was officially decommissioned in 1936.

The pumping station buildings and beam engine were gifted to the Museum of Transport and Technology (MOTAT) with the formation of the museum in the early 1960s to preserve the site and act as the museum's first buildings. Restoration of the beam engine began in 1964 and continued in stages over the following 44 years, returning it to an operational state. The restored beam engine was officially opened by New Zealand Prime Minister Helen Clark on 19 April 2008. As well as the beam engine, the site now houses several other operational historic steam engines.

The Western Springs pumping station is recognised by Pouhere Taonga Heritage New Zealand as a Historic Place Category 1.

== Western Springs beam engine ==
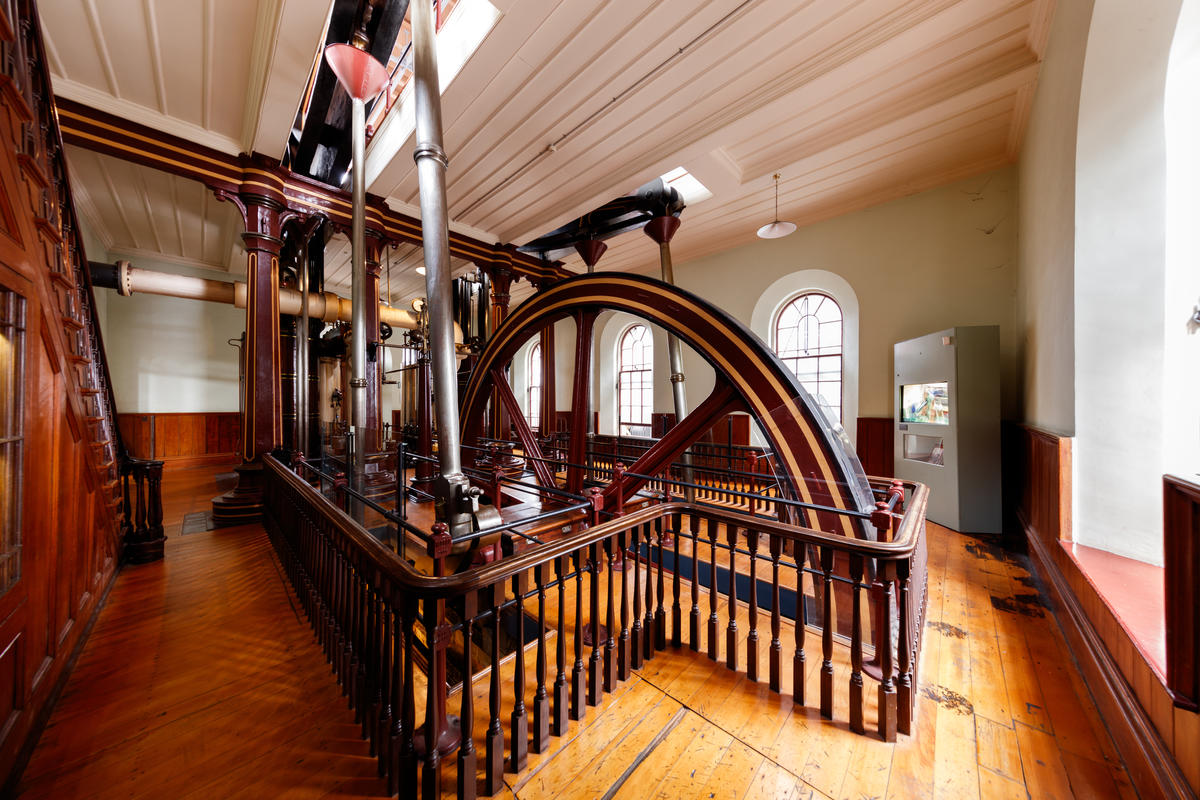
Western Springs Beam Engine

The Western Springs beam engine is a twin-cylinder, double-acting, Woolf compound (double expansion), condensing, steam, rotative beam engine. It has a 20-foot (6.1 metre) diameter flywheel that moves a 24-foot (7.3 metre) beam. The engine drives two water pumps, each pumping 70 gallons (320 litres) per stroke. When the engine was in regular operation it had a working speed of 14 rpm and could move 1,411,200 gallons (6,415,442 litres) per 12 hour shift. The engine's maximum power output is 300 horsepower (150 hp per engine) when operating at 14.5 rpm.

At the time of construction, it was reported that “the engine has few equals, and fewer superiors in the colonies..." It is believed to be the largest remaining beam engine in the southern hemisphere and only twin-Woolf-compound-condensing-beam-steam-engine still in existence, though similar configurations do exist elsewhere.

== History ==
Auckland city originally sourced it's water from rainfall, wells, springs, and streams. From 1866, water was piped to the city from the Pukekawa / Auckland Domain springs. The city's growing population rapidly led to water shortages and water quality issue due to contamination from sewage and industrial waste. In the early 1870s, the newly formed Auckland City Council decided that a water supply system should be established. An abundant source of fresh water was identified at Te Wai Ōrea / Western Springs and the site was chosen as the city's water source, utilising the large flow of fresh water flowing from the springs.

In May 1874, engineer William Errington was appointed by the Auckland City Council to oversee the planning and construction of the Auckland waterworks project of which the Western Springs pumping station and reservoir lake were to be the central components. Plans and specifications were completed in July 1874 and tenders were sought for the construction of the waterworks later that year. T & S Morrin Ltd submitted the winning tender quoting £72,663. The tender covered the construction of the reservoirs, plant, mains pipes, and included £11,000 for the machinery and £2,000 for the pumping station buildings. Construction began in March 1875 and was completed two years later in March 1877. The Western Springs pumping station, and the wider waterworks system, was formally opened by the Auckland City Council on 10 July 1877.

The Auckland Waterworks system consisted of a reservoir lake fed by Te Wai Ōrea / Western Springs, water from the reservoir was then pumped through a network of pipes to several elevated reservoirs across the city (initially at Ponsonby and Khyber Pass Road, a further reservoir was built at Maungawhau / Mount Eden in 1888). The pumping machinery at Western Springs consisted of a large beam engine driven by steam supplied by four Lancashire boilers.

All of the machinery, including the pumping engine and boilers, was sub-contracted to John Key & Son of Kirkcaldy, Scotland for manufacture and supply. The components were manufactured in Scotland and shipped to Auckland in six groups arriving between February and August 1876. On arrival in Auckland, the pumping engine components were transported overland from the Ports of Auckland to Western Springs where they were assembled in the pumping station buildings by local engineering firm Masefield and Company.

The pumping station was in daily operation from 1877 until about the turn of the 20th century. Demand for water outgrew the capacity of Te Wai Ōrea / Western Springs and the water started to show signs of contamination. The Waitākere Ranges Water Supply System replaced Western Springs as Auckland's primary water supply with the construction of several dams in the Waitākere Ranges starting with the Waitākere Reservoir in 1907. The Western Springs pumping station remained as a backup water supply until its final decommissioning in 1936.

After decommissioning, the original Lancashire boilers were removed and scrapped in 1937 and components of the 'A' engine were broken up for scrap during the Second World War. The pumping station's 100 foot tall octagonal brick chimney was sold to Mr E.E. Beale and dismantled in 1948, the bricks were cleaned and reused to construct Beale's family home in Māngere. The rest of the plant, including the beam engine, was also due to be scrapped. However, public interest in the historic machinery halted this with views to retain the site as a museum.

== Restoration ==
The Western Springs Pumping Station and surrounding land were gifted by the Auckland City Council to the newly formed Museum of Transport and Technology (MOTAT) in the early 1960s. The museum began restoration of the pumping station in 1964. Having sat idle since the 1920s, the engine had become rusted and seized up. The buildings and beam engine were restored in stages over the following 40 years by the museum's steam section. It initially had rust removed and was repainted in a red and green colour scheme. Work on the engine freed up its component parts in stages, the flywheel becoming moveable in 1977, and the rest of the engine in 1986. A second phase of restoration began in the 2000s to make the engine operational. The beam engine was operated under steam power for the first time in over 80 years on 29 November 2007. During this period of restoration, the paint applied to the engine during the 1960s was stripped off and it was returned to its original 'chocolate and gold' colour scheme with oiled and polished brightwork and wrought iron. The restored beam engine was officially opened by Prime Minister Helen Clark on 19 April 2008. It remains in operational condition and is run on occasion.

== See also ==
- List of category 1 historic places in Auckland
- Category:Preserved beam engines

== Bibliography ==
- Lane, M., & Pointon, K. (2008, April). The beam engine and Western Springs pumping station. Museum of Transport and Technology (MOTAT).
- Snow, T. (2017). Steam Rises. The Shed, (October/November), pp. 34–38.
- Thornton, G.G. (1982). New Zealand's Industrial Heritage. A.H. & A.W. Reed, Wellington.
- Wilson, L. M. (1994). An iron essay: a short history of the beam engine and Western Springs waterworks. Museum of Transport and Technology (MOTAT).
