= Lawler Sattleday Cottage =

1848 cottage in Auckland, New Zealand

Lawler Sattleday Fencible Cottage
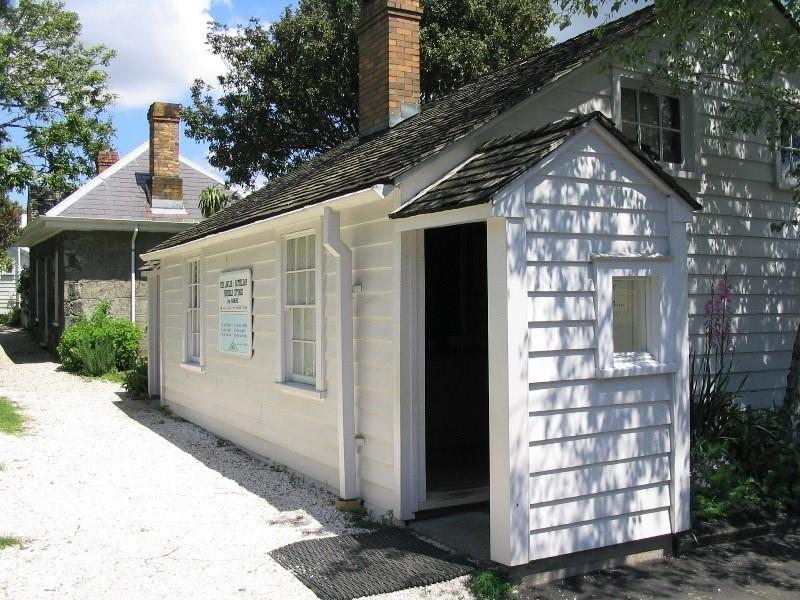
- Interactive map of the Lawler Sattleday Fencible Cottage area
- Etymology: Named after original owners

General information
- Location: Museum of Transport and Technology, Auckland, New Zealand
- Coordinates: 36°52′03″S 174°43′41″E
- Year built: 1848
- Relocated: 1966

Lawler Sattleday Cottage (sometimes stylised as Lawlor Sattleday) is an historic Fencible cottage at the Museum of Transport and Technology (MOTAT) in Auckland, New Zealand. Built in 1848, the cottage was originally located in Panmure, before being moved to its current location at MOTAT in 1966. It was built for Private Daniel Lawler and Private Richard Sattleday, who both migrated to New Zealand from Ireland in 1847. The cottage remains part of Te Pā o MOTAT – MOTAT Village.

== The cottage ==
=== Background ===
Fencible cottages were cottages that officers in the Fencible Corps received on completion of a seven-year military term. The Royal New Zealand Fencibles (also referred to as military pensioners) were retired soldiers who enlisted to serve for seven years in exchange for a cottage and one acre (0.40 ha) of land. The soldiers had to give 12 days of military service per year, and parade on Sundays in full military uniform. Fencibles travelled to New Zealand from England and Ireland on settler ships between 1847 and 1852. There were four main Fencible settlements in Auckland, at Howick, Ōtāhuhu, Onehunga and Panmure.

=== History of Lawler Sattleday ===
Lawler Sattleday Cottage was originally located at Lot 67/68, Section 2, at the Fencible settlement, Panmure. Lot 67 was allocated to Daniel Lawler, and Lot 68 was allocated to Richard Sattleday. It is a double-unit Fencible cottage, a typical example of housing that was provided for a Private in the Fencible Corps in the 1840s. The house was constructed sometime after September 1848, when tenders were called for carpentry and joinery work in officers' quarters in Panmure.

=== Description ===
Lawler Sattleday cottage is an example of a typical 'siamese' or double-unit cottage that was assigned to those with the rank of Private. Though promised individual cottages, due to the lack of space and building materials, conjoined cottages were built instead, with each private and his family taking one half.

The Lawler half has a kitchen/dining area and a sleeping area downstairs, with a small attic upstairs, likely where children would have slept. These cottages were not fitted with any taps, tubs or conveniences of any kind. The cottage does not have any lining or insulation. The Sattleday half of the cottage was demolished at some point before the 1960s, but would likely had a near identical lay out. The Sattleday half was rebuilt upon arrival to MOTAT in 1966. It currently acts as a gallery exhibition space.

== Daniel Lawler ==
Private Daniel Lawler (sometimes stylised as Lawlor) was an Irishman who served in the 95th Regiment. Lawler and his wife, Margaret and 2 children left from Cork, Ireland in the 5th detachment of the Royal New Zealand Fencibles. Lawler and his family boarded the Clifton, which departed from Gravesend, Kent, on 18 August 1847, sailing via Galway. Onboard were 78 pensioners, 63 women and 114 children. The voyage had the highest fatality rate of all Auckland-bound Fencible ships, with 46 deaths.

Lawler settled in the Panmure Village Fencible settlement. In 1853, his daughter Ellin died at 9 years old, followed shortly by his son Michael aged 17 years old. Lawler died in Panmure of consumption in 1860. Margaret lived in Panmure until her death in 1882.

== Richard Sattleday ==
Richard Sattleday (sometimes stylised as Sattelday) (b. 1803) enlisted in the 61st Regiment at 11 years old in 1815. Sattleday had a height of 5'8" and had a fair complexion. He only went onto the payroll in 1822 when he turned 18 years old. Sattleday served a total of 23 years and 6 months, including 12 years in the East Indies and Ceylon. Sattleday was a Private, then Captain, but was reduced to Drummer in 1830.

He was discharged in May 1840 and married Elizabeth (b. 1823, née Wright) on 16 July 1840. The couple had three children, Catherine (b. 1841), Elizabeth and a son. Sattleday and his family also travelled to New Zealand on the Clifton, and settled in Panmure. Richard Sattleday lived until 1890, and Elizabeth until 1898. Both are buried in Panmure.

== Cottage move to MOTAT ==
In 1966, the cottage was moved from its original site in Panmure to MOTAT at Western Springs, and was one of the earliest objects in the collection.

=== Acquisition ===
In February 1966, Winifred MacDonald (then Secretary of the Auckland Historical Society, and part of the inaugural MOTAT committee) reported the offer of "Mary's Cottage", one half of an original Fencible double-unit cottage located on Lagoon Drive, Panmure. One half of the cottage had been demolished, but the remaining half had been occupied by Daniel Lawler. The offer was quickly accepted, and the cottage was made ready for moving by a small party of volunteers, before being moved by a contractor. The cottage remained on temporary timber blocks for a few weeks whilst final placement arrangements were made. In May 1966, John Hogan (MOTAT director from 1965 to 1970) announced that the original half of the Lawler Sattleday Fencible cottage—along with the Quinlan Fencible Cottage and the Bagnall cottage, now known as Willow Cottage — had been placed in its permanent position.

=== Renovations ===
Upon arrival to MOTAT, it was clear that extensive renovations were required. The roof timbers were 'riddled with borer', and there were native termites present. The missing half of the cottage was built from 100 year old kauri bought from a wrecker in Mangere, and $250 worth of timber donated by the Auckland Timber Merchants Association. Costs were also in part covered by a $500 donation from ASB, and funds raised from a garden party event. The New Lynn Lions Club volunteered their time to repaint the cottage.

The renovations and rebuilding were completed by the end of 1968, and was opened for public viewing. Although both halves of the cottage were complete, it continued under the name of "Lawler" for the next 25 years. It was not until research by MOTAT volunteers that the identity of the other occupant, Richard Sattleday was discovered. It was from then known as Lawler Sattleday Cottage.

== Present day ==
Lawler Sattleday cottage remains a key part of Te Pa o MOTAT – MOTAT Village. The Sattleday half of the cottage is a rotating gallery space.

== See also ==
- Quinlan Cottage
