= Quinlan Cottage =

Historic cottage in Auckland

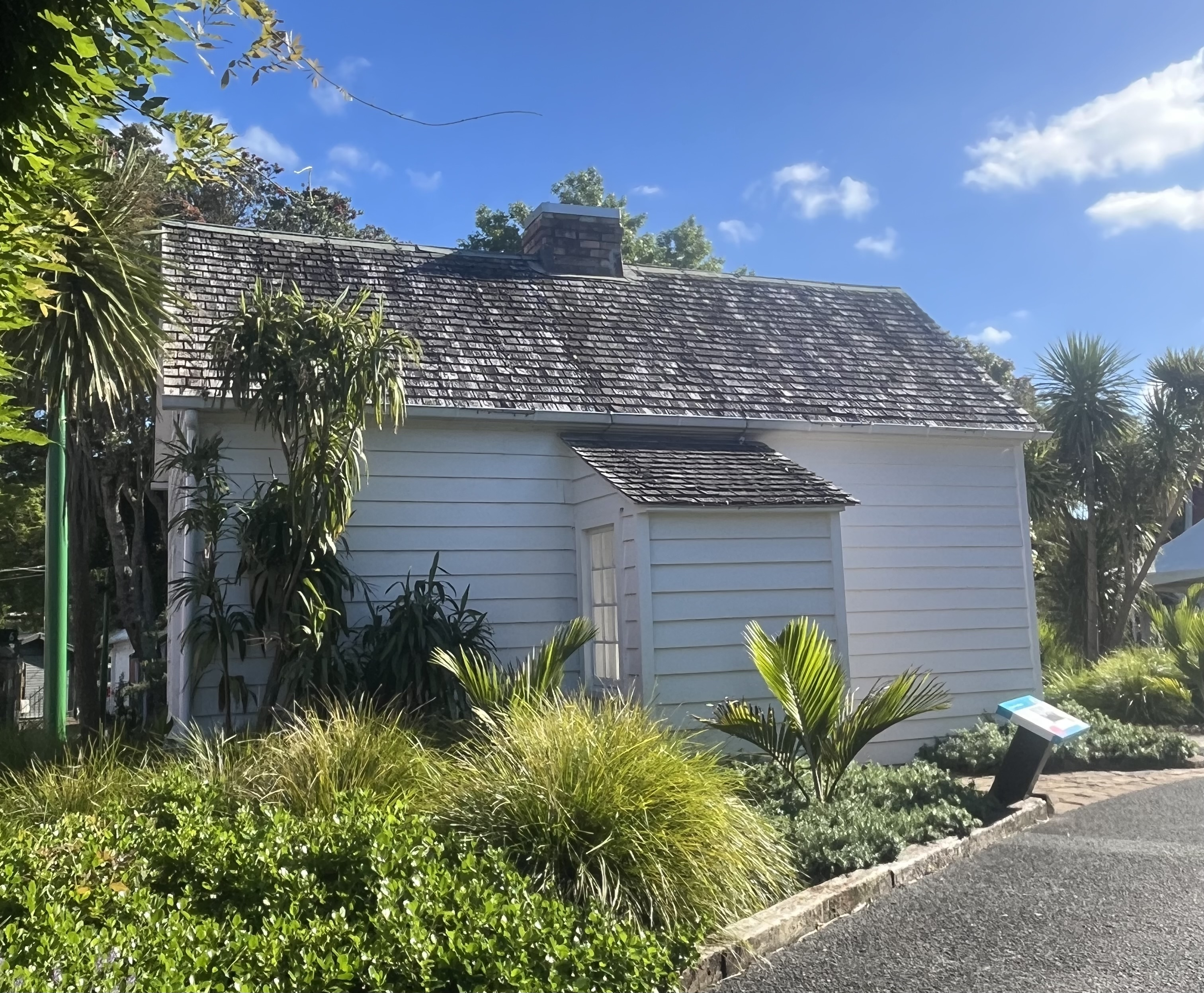
- Interactive map of the Quinlan Cottage area
- Etymology: Named after original owner

General information
- Location: Museum of Transport and Technology, Auckland, New Zealand
- Coordinates: 36°52′03″S 174°43′41″E
- Year built: 1848
- Relocated: 1964

Quinlan Cottage is an historic Fencible sergeant's cottage at the Museum of Transport and Technology (MOTAT) in Auckland, New Zealand. Built in 1848, the cottage was originally located in Panmure, before being moved to its current location at MOTAT in 1964. It was built for Sergeant Patrick Quinlan, who lived in the cottage from 1848 until his death in 1877. The cottage remains part of Te Pā o MOTAT – MOTAT Village.

== Cottage ==
=== Background ===
Fencible cottages refer to cottages that officers who served in the Fencible Corps received on completion of a seven-year military term. The Royal New Zealand Fencibles (also referred to as military pensioners) were retired soldiers who enlisted to serve for seven years in exchange for a cottage and one acre (0.40 ha) of land. The soldiers had to give 12 days of military service per year, and parade on Sundays in full military uniform. Fencibles travelled to New Zealand from England and Ireland on settler ships between 1847 and 1852. There were four main Fencible cottage settlements in Auckland, at Howick, Ōtāhuhu, Onehunga and Panmure.

=== History of Quinlan Cottage ===
Quinlan Cottage was originally located at Lot 76, Section 2, at the corner of Ireland and Cleary Roads in Panmure. It is a single-unit Fencible cottage, a typical example of housing that was provided for a sergeant of the Fencible Corps in the 1840s. The house was constructed sometime after September 1848, when tenders were called for carpentry and joinery work in officers' quarters in Panmure.

=== Description ===
Sergeant Quinlan's cottage has two small rooms downstairs, and a large attic upstairs. There is a midline chimney with an open fireplace on either side, one for each of the downstairs rooms. The house has four sash windows; two downstairs and two at each end of the attic. A very narrow wooden staircase allowed access to the attic. These cottages were not fitted with any taps, tubs or conveniences of any kind.

== Patrick Quinlan ==
=== Early life ===
Patrick Quinlan was born in May 1803 in Roscrea, County Tipperary, Ireland, to John and Julia Quinlan (née Queen). A description in the UK Regimental Registers of Service describe him as being 5 feet 8 1/2 inches (1.74 m) tall, of fair complexion, with black eyes and brown hair. Quinlan was in his teens when his mother died and his father remarried, but he did not get on with his stepmother.

Quinlan went to live with an uncle who owned a distillery, and grew fond of whisky. Everytime he drank, Quinlan would dream of his mother appearing at his bedside saying, "Paddy, your mother is watching you". He had this same dream on numerous occasions. Eventually, he made the decision to give up drinking and enlisted in the army.

=== Military career ===
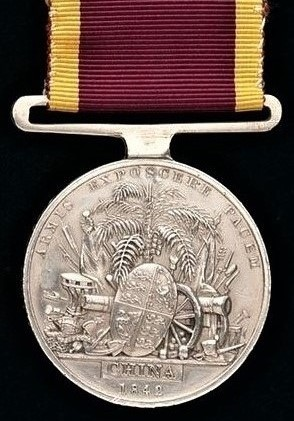
Example of 1842 China Medal awarded to those in the British Army.

Quinlan joined the 49th Regiment of Foot at Thurles, Tipperary, in 1821 aged 18, for a bounty of £3. The 49th Regiment was known as Princess Charlotte of Wales's or the Hertfordshire Regiment. Quinlan was promoted from private to corporal in January 1829, and then to sergeant in September 1831.

Quinlan served for 22 years and 193 days, which included 6 years 8 months in the Cape Colony (South Africa), 11 years 9 months in India, and 2 years 10 months in China. Whilst in India, he married his first wife, Mary (née Quin), who was the adjutant's daughter.

Quinlan gained a medal for his services in the First Opium War in China. On 10 February 1841, while in China, he was court-martialled for being drunk when orderly sergeant of the Company, and his rank was reduced. However, he was reinstated to corporal 11 months later. After a long military career, he was discharged due to chronic rheumatism on 29 December 1843 at Chatham. He was a sergeant at time of discharge.

=== Move to Auckland ===
Owing to his long military career, Quinlan was eligible to join the Royal New Zealand Fencible Corps. Along with his wife and four children, he set sail with the 5th detachment of the Royal New Zealand Fencibles, aboard the Clifton, which departed from Gravesend, Kent, on 18 August 1847, sailing via Galway. Onboard were 78 pensioners, 63 women and 114 children. The voyage had the highest fatality rate of all Auckland-bound Fencible ships, with 46 deaths. Before arriving in Auckland, Mary and two of their children died.

=== Life in New Zealand ===
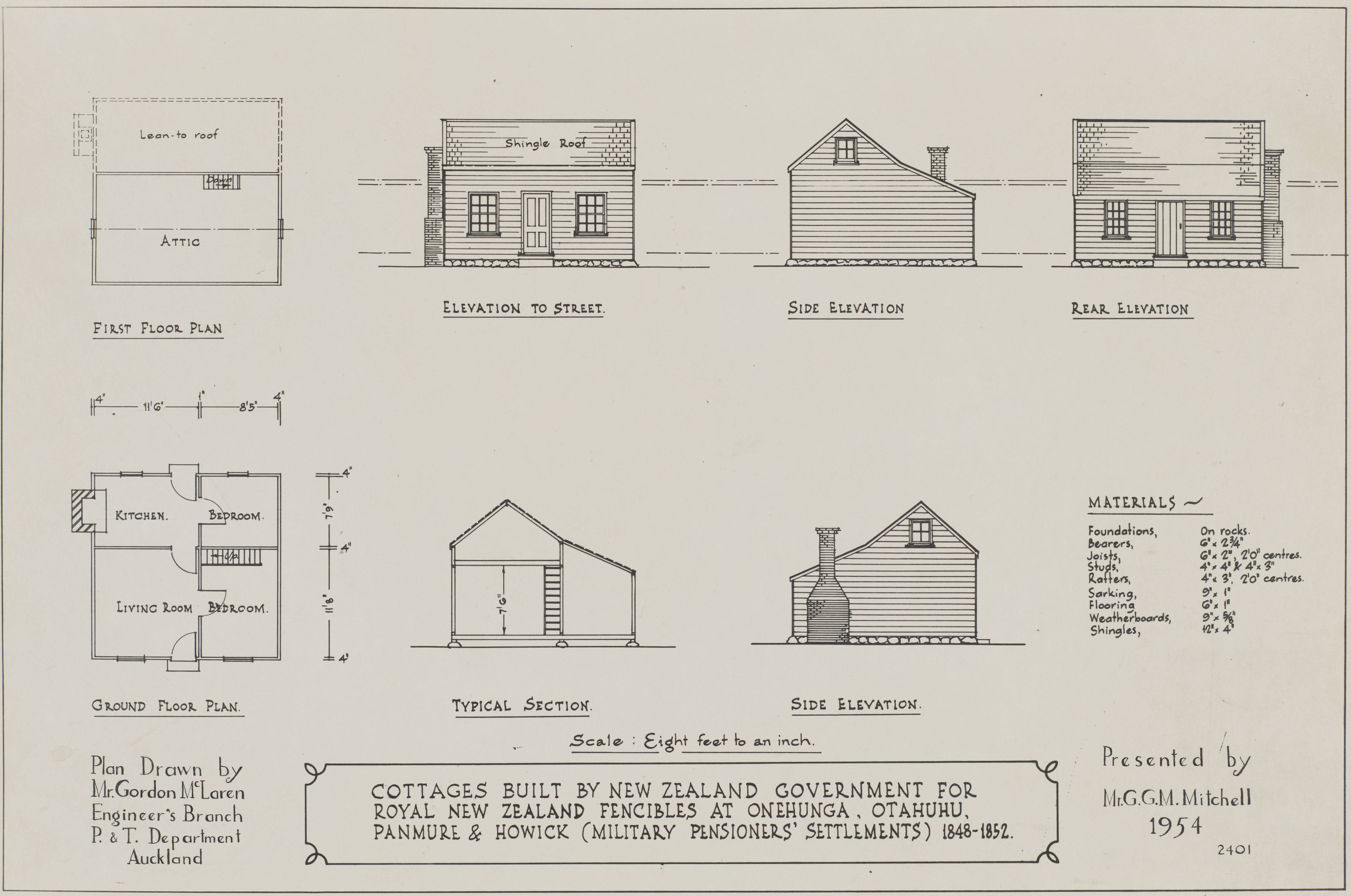
Original Plans for Fencible Cottages

The Clifton arrived in Auckland on 23 January 1848. Quinlan took possession of his cottage and acre of land in the following months. He married his second wife later that year, also Mary (née Head). Mary (1822–1887) was the daughter of William Head, another Fencible, who had also arrived on the Clifton. Patrick and Mary lived adjacent to William in Panmure.

Quinlan was one of six sergeants appointed officers of the 5th Company of Royal New Zealand Fencible Corps at Panmure. Holding the rank of sergeant, he was entitled to a single-unit Fencible cottage. Ordinary soldiers received double-unit cottages, typically to share with a second soldier and his family. Quinlan settled in Panmure village on one acre, working as a carpenter and farmer. He also was his unit's paymaster.

=== Death ===
Quinlan died on 23 July 1877 in Panmure, aged 74. His cause of death was said to be exhaustion and long illness. He was buried in the Panmure Catholic Church graveyard, near many of his family, including his son John (Jack) Quinlan, who had died two years prior. He left his house and the acre of land to his wife. His horses, carts, other agricultural implements and his cattle were left to his son, Patrick, on the condition he stayed to look after his sisters and mother.

=== Legacy ===
Quinlan Street, Mount Wellington, 1072

In June 2013, the Maungakiekie-Tāmaki Local Board moved that a new road would be named for Patrick Quinlan. New "Street B", connecting Mountain Road to the Ellerslie–Panmure Highway was coined Quinlan Street under Resolution MT/2012/37.

== Cottage move to MOTAT ==
In 1964, the cottage was moved from its original site in Panmure to MOTAT at Western Springs, and was one of the earliest objects in the collection. The move was organised in part by Quinlan's grandson and the first paid employee of MOTAT, Harold Stone.

=== Acquisition ===
The acquisition of Quinlan Cottage into the MOTAT collection signalled a significant shift. The original intention of the Auckland Historical Society (AHS) was to help the Old Time Transport Preservation League find a site in Auckland, but it became clear that this also was an opportunity to preserve some of Auckland's "fast-vanishing old buildings".

In October 1963, Winifred MacDonald (then Secretary of the AHS, and part of the inaugural MOTAT committee) told the council that the last Fencible cottage in Auckland still in original condition was to be demolished, unless preserved by the Museum Society. At a meeting on 7 November, the Council agreed that every effort should be made to preserve the cottage, which was planned to be demolished by the new landowner and the Methodist Church. A sub-committee of the AHS persuaded them to instead donate it to the Historical Society.

=== Move ===
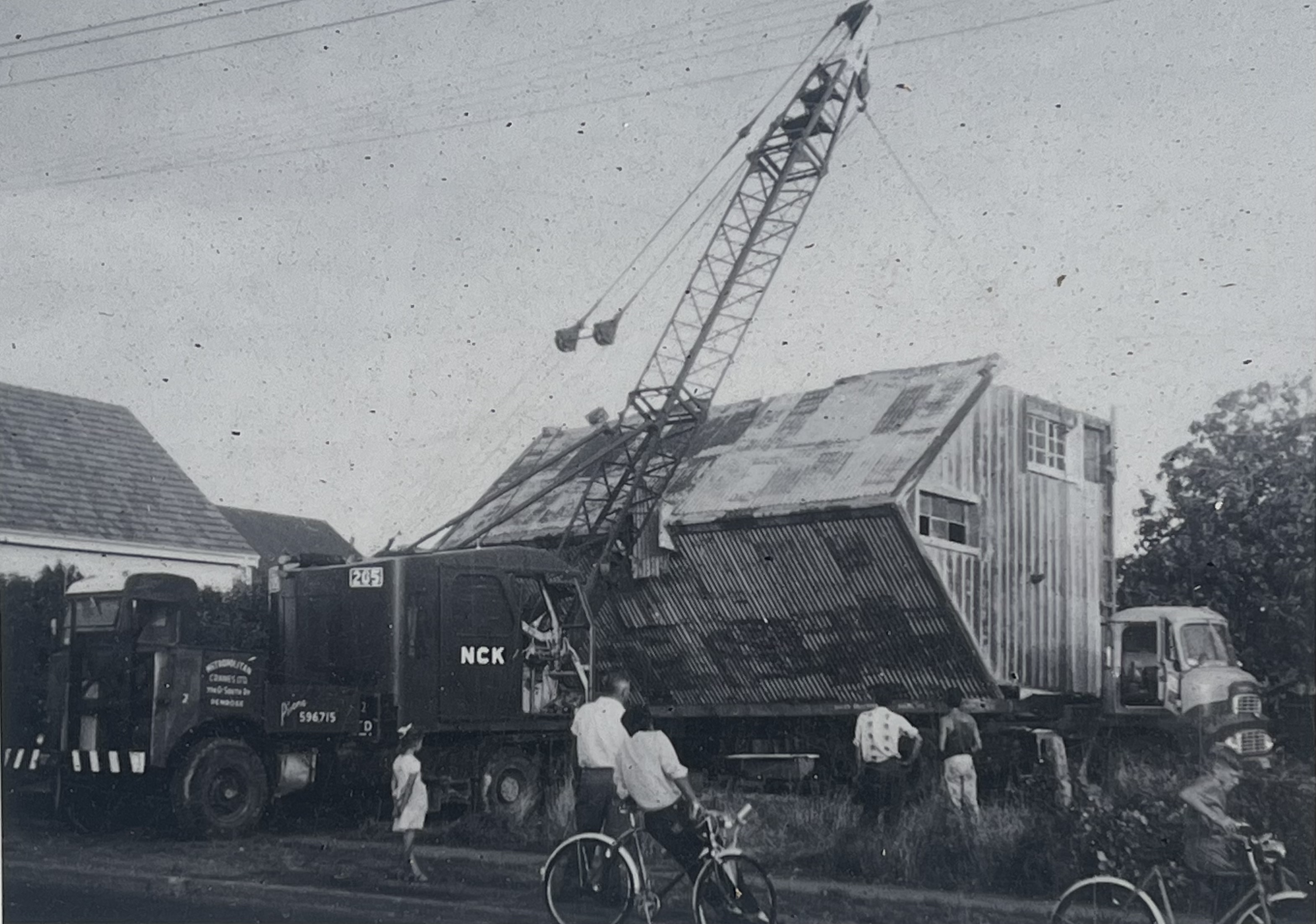
Quinlan Cottage being moved to MOTAT on its side, 1964

In February 1964, the relocation of the cottage to Western Springs was organised. Owing to the height of the cottage, it had to be delivered to MOTAT lying on its side on a trailer. At time of delivery, there was no designated site, so the derelict cottage was put on timber blocks at a temporary location for at least 18 months before being moved to its present permanent position. In May 1966, John Hogan (MOTAT director from 1965 to 1970) announced that Quinlan Fencible Cottage—along with the original half of the Lawlor-Sattleday Fencible cottage, and the Bagnall cottage, now known as Willow Cottage—had been placed in its permanent position.

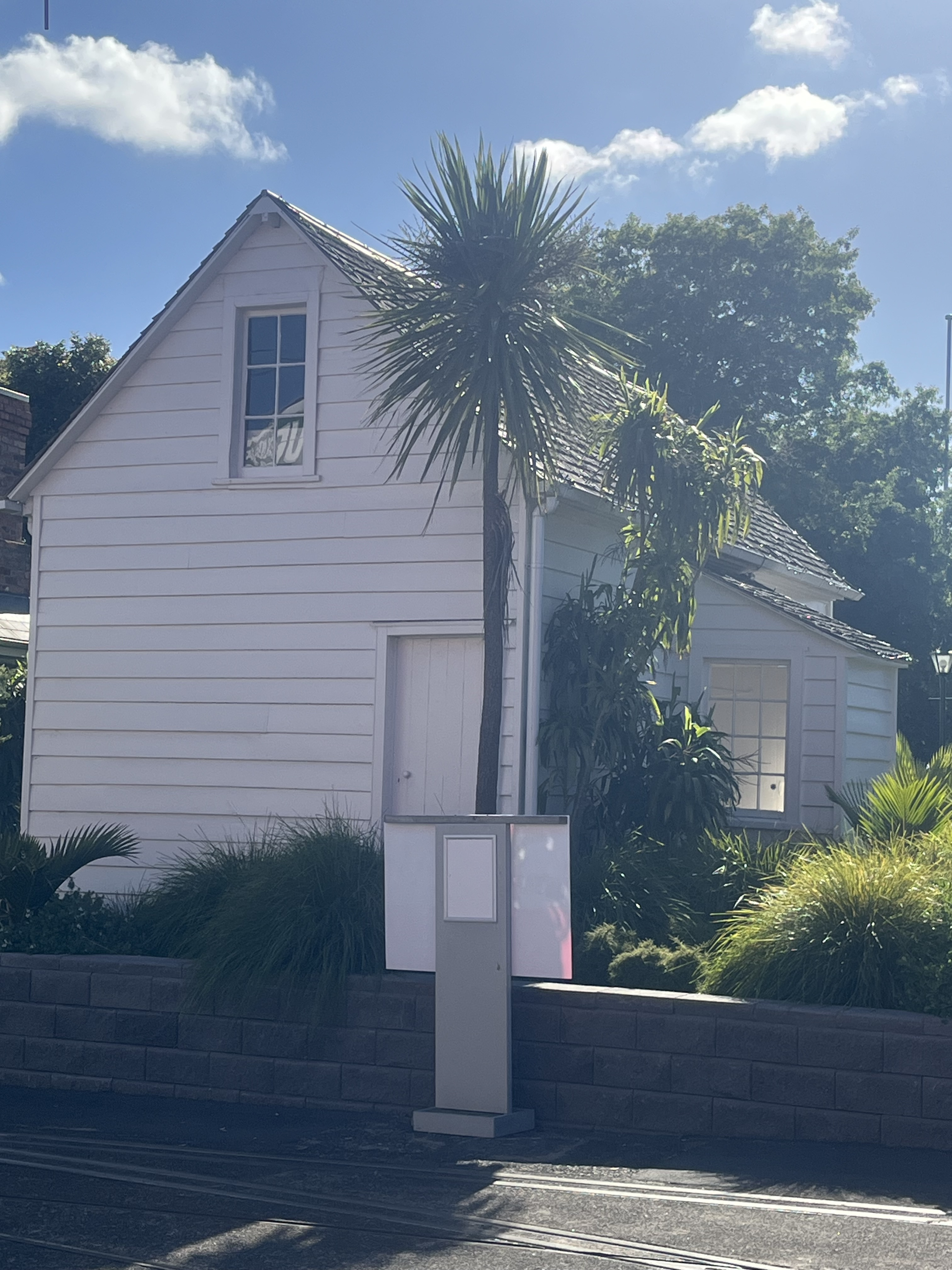
Quinlan Cottage in its permanent position, 2025

The cottage remains at MOTAT as a key part of Te Pā o MOTAT – MOTAT Village.
