= List of category 1 historic places in Auckland =

The List of category 1 historic places in Auckland contains the category 1 heritage sites and buildings from Auckland registered in the New Zealand Heritage List/Rārangi Kōrero (formerly the Register) as Historic Place Category 1 or Historic Area.

This list is maintained and updated by Heritage New Zealand (aka Heritage New Zealand Pouhere Taonga, initially the National Historic Places Trust and, from 1963 to 2014, the New Zealand Historic Places Trust).

The heritage buildings and areas in Auckland classified as Historic Place Category 2 are listed in the List of category 2 historic places in Auckland.

== List ==
Name	List Type	Address	Number	Image
Old All Saints Church (Anglican) & Churchyard (Including Grave Monuments & Markers)	Historic Place Category 1	Cook Street and Selwyn Road, Howick	11	
Albert Barracks Wall (University of Auckland Campus)	Historic Place Category 1	Alfred Street	12	
Chapel of St John the Evangelist	Historic Place Category 1	188–226 St Johns Road, Meadowbank	13	
College of St John the Evangelist; Dining Hall and Waitoa Room	Historic Place Category 1	188–226 St Johns Road, Meadowbank	14	
Ewelme Cottage	Historic Place Category 1	14 Ayr Street, Parnell	15	
Grafton Bridge	Historic Place Category 1	Grafton	16	
High Court Building	Historic Place Category 1	22–24 Waterloo Quadrant	17	
Highwic	Historic Place Category 1	40 Gillies Avenue, Epsom	18	
Hulme Court	Historic Place Category 1	350 Parnell Road, Parnell	19	
St Andrew's Church (Presbyterian)	Historic Place Category 1	2 Symonds Street	20	
St Mary's Church	Historic Place Category 1	437 Parnell Road, Parnell	21	
St Stephen's Chapel (Anglican) and Churchyard	Historic Place Category 1	12 Judge Street, Parnell	22	
Selwyn Court	Historic Place Category 1	6–8 St Stephens Avenue, Parnell	23	
Selwyn Library	Historic Place Category 1	6–8 St Stephens Avenue, Parnell	24	
Old Arts Building, University of Auckland	Historic Place Category 1	22 Princes Street	25	
Alberton	Historic Place Category 1	100 Mt Albert Road, Mt Albert	26	
Colonial Ammunition Company Shot Tower	Historic Place Category 1	26–30 Normanby Road, Mt Eden	87	
Fort Takapuna / O Peretu	Historic Place Category 1	2–14 Gillespie Place and Vauxhall Road, Narrow Neck	86	
Mt Eden Prison	Historic Place Category 1	Lauder Road, Mt Eden	88	
The Pah (Former)	Historic Place Category 1	64, 72, 72A Hillsborough Road, Hillsborough	89	
King's College Chapel	Historic Place Category 1	41 Golf Ave; Mangere Rd; Hospital Rd, King's College, Otahuhu	90	
Onehunga Blockhouse	Historic Place Category 1	Quadrant Road, Grey Street and Jellicoe Park, Onehunga	91	
Auckland City Art Gallery	Historic Place Category 1	1 Kitchener Street and Wellesley Street	92	
Auckland Railway Station	Historic Place Category 1	132–148 Beach Road	93	
Auckland War Memorial Museum	Historic Place Category 1	Museum Circuit Domain	94	
Bank of New Zealand Building	Historic Place Category 1	125–129 Queen Street	95	
Carrington Hospital (Former)	Historic Place Category 1	1/1-44/1 Carrington Road, Point Chevalier	96	
Cathedral Church of St Patrick and St Joseph (Catholic)	Historic Place Category 1	41 Wyndham Street and 1 St Patricks Square	97	
Church of the Holy Sepulchre and Hall	Historic Place Category 1	71 Khyber Pass Road and 2–10 Burleigh Street, Grafton	98	
St Matthew's-in-the-City Church (Anglican)	Historic Place Category 1	132–134 Hobson St, 187 Federal St and Wellesley St West	99	
Civic Theatre Building	Historic Place Category 1	67 Queen Street	100	
Chief Post Office	Historic Place Category 1	12 Queen Street, Tyler Street and Galway Street	101	
Ferry Building	Historic Place Category 1	99 Quay Street	102	
Neligan House (flats)	Historic Place Category 1	12 St Stephens Avenue, Parnell	103	
Customhouse (Former)	Historic Place Category 1	22 Customs Street West and Albert Street	104	
Government House (Former)	Historic Place Category 1	Waterloo Quadrant	105	
General Buildings (including Yorkshire House)	Historic Place Category 1	29–37 Shortland Street	106	
House (Hanna)	Historic Place Category 1	11 Arney Road, Remuera	107	
Deanery (Former)	Historic Place Category 1	17 St Stephens Avenue and Brighton Road, Parnell	108	
Kinder House	Historic Place Category 1	2 Ayr Street and 482 Parnell Road, Parnell	110	
Melanesian Mission Building and Stone Garden Walls	Historic Place Category 1	40–44 Tamaki Drive, Mission Bay	111	
Bayfield School (Former)	Historic Place Category 1	272-1/272 Jervois Road and Wharf Road, Herne Bay	112	
St Mark's Church (Anglican)	Historic Place Category 1	85–89 Remuera Road, Remuera	113	
Western Springs Pumping Station	Historic Place Category 1	805 Great North Road, Museum of Transport and Technology, Western Springs	114	
Remuera Public Library	Historic Place Category 1	431 Remuera Road and St Vincent Avenue, Remuera	115	
St Andrew's Church (Anglican)	Historic Place Category 1	92–98 St Andrews Road, Epsom	116	
St John Ambulance National Offices	Historic Place Category 1	47–49 Pitt Street	117	
St Michael's Church (Catholic)	Historic Place Category 1	6 Beatrice Road, Remuera	118	
Sir George Grey Statue	Historic Place Category 1	Albert Park, 33–43 Princes Street	119	
South British Insurance Building (Former)	Historic Place Category 1	5–13 Shortland Street	121	
Cenotaph	Historic Place Category 1	Cenotaph Road Domain	122	
Strand Arcade	Historic Place Category 1	233–237 Queen Street; Elliot Street	123	
Domain Wintergardens	Historic Place Category 1	Wintergarden Road Domain	124	
Bell House/Restaurant	Historic Place Category 1	75 Bells Road, Pakuranga	125	
Clark House	Historic Place Category 1	25–29 Clark Road, Hobsonville	126	
Acacia Cottage	Historic Place Category 1	Olive Grove Road, Cornwall Park, One Tree Hill	525	
Auckland Town Hall	Historic Place Category 1	301–303 Queen Street	549	
Bishop's House (Catholic)	Historic Place Category 1	30 New St, 10 St Francis De Sales St and Green St, Ponsonby	555	
Church and Convent of St John the Baptist (Catholic)	Historic Place Category 1	216–218 Parnell Road and Denby Street, Parnell	562	
Dilworth Terrace Houses	Historic Place Category 1	1–8 Dilworth Terrace, Parnell	567	
Terrace Houses	Historic Place Category 1	29, 27, 25 Symonds Street	568	
Emerald Villa	Historic Place Category 1	4 Tohunga Crescent, Parnell	571	
Bishop Pompallier's House (Former)	Historic Place Category 1	57 St Marys Road, Ponsonby	573	
Synagogue (Former)	Historic Place Category 1	19A Princes Street and Bowen Avenue	578	
Leys Institute Gymnasium	Historic Place Category 1	14 St Marys Road, Ponsonby	612	
Leys Institute Public Library Building	Historic Place Category 1	20 St Marys Road, Ponsonby	613	
Northern Steamship Company Building	Historic Place Category 1	122–124 Quay Street, Gore Street and Tyler Street	622	
New Zealand Guardian Trust Building	Historic Place Category 1	101–107 Queen Street	623	
Occidental Hotel	Historic Place Category 1	6–8 Vulcan Lane	624	
Ponsonby Baptist Church	Historic Place Category 1	43 Jervois Road and 2 Seymour Street, Ponsonby	627	
Ponsonby Post Office (Former)	Historic Place Category 1	1–3 St Marys Road and College Hill, Ponsonby	628	
Queen's Ferry Hotel	Historic Place Category 1	12 Vulcan Lane	630	
Remuera Railway Station and Signal Box	Historic Place Category 1	Market Road, Remuera	634	
St Benedict's Church and Presbytery Complex (Catholic)	Historic Place Category 1	5, 7A and 7B Alex Evans St, and 1 and 1A St Benedicts St, Newton	640	
St James' Church (Presbyterian)	Historic Place Category 1	1 Beresford Street	642	
St Mary's Old Convent Chapel	Historic Place Category 1	9–17 New Street, Ponsonby	649	
St Paul's Church (Anglican)	Historic Place Category 1	28 Symonds Street	650	
Terrace of Shops	Historic Place Category 1	456–486 Queen Street	655	
Smith & Caughey Building	Historic Place Category 1	Wellesley Street West and Elliot Street	656	
1YA Radio Station Building (Former)	Historic Place Category 1	74 Shortland Street	660	
Northern Club Building	Historic Place Category 1	19 Princes Street, Kitchener Street and Bankside Street	663	
Public Trust Office (Former)	Historic Place Category 1	11 Mayoral Drive	664	
Union Fish Company Building	Historic Place Category 1	116–118 Quay Street; Tyler Street	666	
Vulcan Buildings	Historic Place Category 1	118–124 Queen Street	668	
Maurice Shadbolt House and Studio	Historic Place Category 1	35 Arapito Road, South Titirangi, Titirangi	2286	
Clifton	Historic Place Category 1	11 Castle Drive, Epsom	2623	
Courtville (Corner Courtville)	Historic Place Category 1	11 Parliament Street and Waterloo Quadrant	2624	
Marivare	Historic Place Category 1	60 Ranfurly Road, Epsom	2642	
St Patrick's Presbytery (Catholic)	Historic Place Category 1	43 Wyndham Street and Hobson Street	2645	
Bluestone Store	Historic Place Category 1	9-11 Durham Lane	2647	
Bean Rock Lighthouse	Historic Place Category 1	Bean Rock, Waitemata Harbour	3295	
St James Theatre	Historic Place Category 1	314 Queen Street	4404	
Landmark House	Historic Place Category 1	187–189 Queen Street	4470	
Auckland Grammar School Main Block	Historic Place Category 1	Mountain Road, Epsom	4471	
War Memorial, Auckland Grammar School	Historic Place Category 1	Mountain Road, Epsom	4472	
Auckland Savings Bank (Former)	Historic Place Category 1	256–260 Queen Street	4473	
Old Choral Hall, University of Auckland	Historic Place Category 1	5–7 Symonds Street and Alfred Street	4474	
Cleave's Building (Former)	Historic Place Category 1	10 Vulcan Lane	4477	
John Logan Campbell Monument	Historic Place Category 1	Manukau Road and Campbell Crescent, Epsom	4478	
Esplanade Hotel	Historic Place Category 1	2 Victoria Road, Devonport	4481	
Blackett's Building	Historic Place Category 1	86–92 Queen Street	4483	
Courtville (Middle Courtville)	Historic Place Category 1	9 Parliament Street	4487	
Stoneways	Historic Place Category 1	46 Mountain Road, Epsom	4499	
Whare Tane	Historic Place Category 1	26 Clive Road, Epsom	4503	
Rockcliff	Historic Place Category 1	6A King Edward Parade, Devonport	4518	
Green Lane Hospital	Historic Place Category 1	202–214 Green Lane West, Epsom	4536	
Wharf Police Building	Historic Place Category 1	102 Quay Street, Britomart Place and Tyler Street	4575	
Australis House	Historic Place Category 1	36–38 Customs Street East, Gore Street and Galway Street	4577	
Royal New Zealand Foundation of the Blind Main Building	Historic Place Category 1	545-547A Parnell Road, Parnell	4579	
Pearson House	Historic Place Category 1	10 Titoki Street, Parnell	4580	
House	Historic Place Category 1	50 Ponsonby Road	4581	
Dilworth Building	Historic Place Category 1	22–32 Queen Street and 5 Customs Street East	4600	
One Tree Hill Obelisk	Historic Place Category 1	One Tree Hill summit, One Tree Hill	4601	
Carnegie Free Library (Former)	Historic Place Category 1	55 Princes Street and O'Rorke Street, Onehunga	4796	
District Court (Former Magistrates Court)	Historic Place Category 1	40A Kitchener Street	4909	
Cotswolds	Historic Place Category 1	37 Wairakei Street, Greenlane	5440	
St John's Home	Historic Place Category 1	80 Wyllie Road, Papatoetoe	5472	
Ōtuataua Stonefields	Historic Place Category 1	30–56 Ihumātao Quarry Road, 545–619 Ōruarangi Road, 261–315 Ihumātao Road & Quarry Road, Ihumātao, Māngere	6055	
North Head / Maungauika	Historic Place Category 1	18 Takarunga Road, Devonport	7005	
Airedale Street Cottages	Historic Place Category 1	30 Airedale Street	7089	
Onehunga Primary School (Former)	Historic Place Category 1	83–89 Selwyn Street, Onehunga	7109	
St Saviour's Chapel	Historic Place Category 1	80 Wyllie Road, Papatoetoe	7169	
Auckland Unitarian Church	Historic Place Category 1	1a Ponsonby Road, Ponsonby	7178	
Castor Bay Battery and Camp / Te Rahopara o Peretu	Historic Place Category 1	117 and 137–145 Beach Road, Castor Bay	7265	
Rocklands Hall	Historic Place Category 1	87 Gillies Avenue, Epsom	7276	
Vernon Brown House	Historic Place Category 1	91 Arney Road, Remuera	7290	
Baptist Tabernacle	Historic Place Category 1	429 Queen Street	7357	
Windsor Castle Hotel	Historic Place Category 1	144 Parnell Road	7406	
Stables (Former)	Historic Place Category 1	32 St Benedicts Street, Newton	7425	
Campbell Free Kindergarten (Former)	Historic Place Category 1	203–271 Victoria Street West	7537	
Frank Sargeson House	Historic Place Category 1	14A Esmonde Road, Takapuna	7540	
Fitzroy Hotel (Former)	Historic Place Category 1	75–77 Wakefield Street	7582	
Jean Batten Place Departmental Building (Former)	Historic Place Category 1	7 Fort Street, 9 Jean Batten Place and 12 Shortland Street	7631	
McLaren Garage (Former)	Historic Place Category 1	586–592 Remuera Road, Remuera	7656	
Auckland Municipal Destructor and Depot (Former)	Historic Place Category 1	210–218 Victoria Street West, Union St and Drake St, Freemans Bay	7664	
Victoria Theatre	Historic Place Category 1	48–56 Victoria Road, Devonport	7712	
Hamurana	Historic Place Category 1	29 Princes Street	7733	
Pembridge	Historic Place Category 1	31 Princes Street	7734	
Wesleyan Chapel (Former)	Historic Place Category 1	8A Pitt Street	7752	
Symonds Street Cemetery	Historic Place Category 1	72 Karangahape Rd, 105–107, 120 Symonds St and St Martins Lane	7753	
Chelsea Sugar Refinery and Estate	Historic Place Category 1	57, 60, 95, 100 Colonial Road, 22 Langstone Place, 60, 69 Rawene Road, 93 Onetaunga Road, Birkenhead	7792	
Isaacs' Bonded Stores (Former)	Historic Place Category 1	22 Fort Street and 16 Commerce Street	7819	
Corban's Winery and Mt Lebanon Vineyards (Former)	Historic Place Category 1	2 Mt Lebanon Lane, Henderson	9336	
O'Neill's Point Cemetery	Historic Place Category 1	R122 Bayswater Avenue, Bayswater	9394	
Queens Wharf	Historic Place Category 1	Quay Street	9500	
Auckland Women's Suffrage Memorial	Historic Place Category 1	Khartoum Place and Te Hā o Hine Place Central	9567	
Gilfillan's Store (Former)	Historic Place Category 1	95 Queen Street, Exchange Lane and Mills Lane	9581	
Auckland Timber Company Building (Former)	Historic Place Category 1	104 Fanshawe Street	9583	
Costley Training Institute (Former)	Historic Place Category 1	84–90 Richmond Rd and Dickens St; Chamberlain St, Grey Lynn	9584	
D. Graham and Company's Building (Former)	Historic Place Category 1	104–106 Queen Street	9641	
Brian Brake House (Former)	Historic Place Category 1	73 Scenic Drive, Titirangi	9649	
First World War Memorial Beacon	Historic Place Category 1	Quay Street and Lower Albert Street	9652	
Te Kāinga Aroha (Former)	Historic Place Category 1	29A Hepburn Street and 1 Smith Street, Freemans Bay	9681	
Reuben Watts House (Former)	Historic Place Category 1	14 Rewiti Avenue and William Street, Takapuna	9686	
Northern Districts Combined Headquarters Bunker	Historic Place Category 1	74 Epsom Avenue, Epsom	9747	
Hotel Titirangi (Former), Te Uru Gallery and the Treasure House (Former)	Historic Place Category 1	418–420 Titirangi Road and 501 South Titirangi Road, Titirangi	9823	
Colonial Ammunition Company Office (Former)	Historic Place Category 1	49 Normanby Road, Mt Eden	9926	
Myers Park Historic Area	Historic Area	Upper Queen St	7008	
Renall Street Historic Area	Historic Area	Renall Street	7010	
Vulcan Lane Historic Area	Historic Area	Vulcan Lane	7011	
Harbour Historic Area	Historic Area	Quay Street	7158	
Quay Street Historic Area	Historic Area	Quay Street East	7159	
Customs Street Historic Area	Historic Area	Customs Street East	7160	
Upper Symonds Street Historic Area	Historic Area	Eden Terrace, Auckland	7367	
Te Naupata / Musick Point	Historic Area	20 Musick Point Road; 4 Clovelly Road, Bucklands Beach	9335	

== See also ==
- List of category 2 historic places in Auckland
- Category:Lists of historic places in New Zealand

== Bibliography ==
- New Zealand Heritage List, Heritage New Zealand
