= Strand Arcade, Auckland =

New Zealand shopping arcade

Strand Arcade
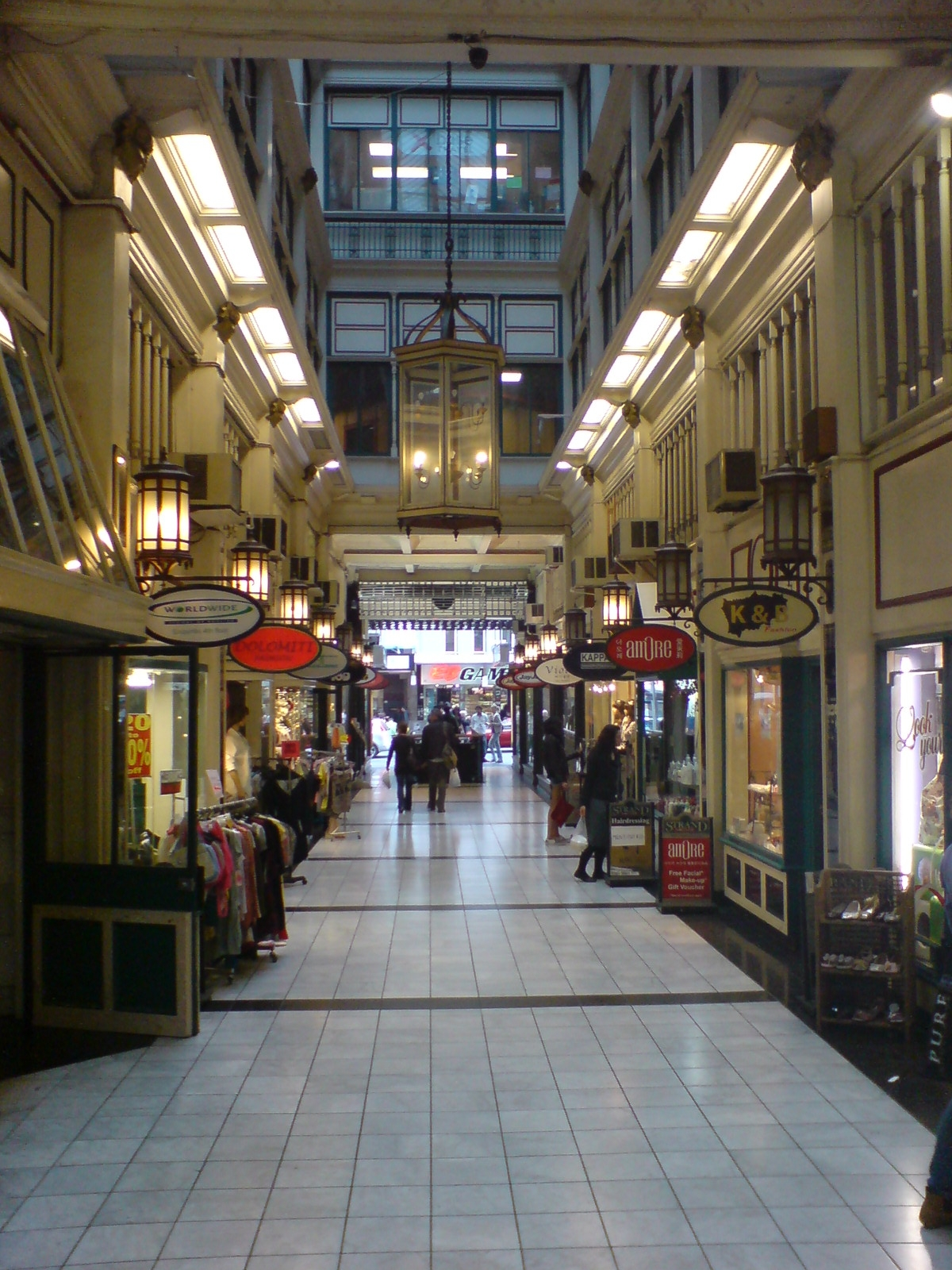
- Interior of Strand Arcade, 2010
- Interactive map of Strand Arcade
- Location: 233–237 Queen Street, Auckland, New Zealand
- Coordinates: 36°50′59″S 174°45′52″E
- Built: 1899–1900
- Rebuilt: 1909–1910
- Architect: Arthur P. Wilson
- Architectural style: Italianate

Heritage New Zealand – Category 1
- Type: Historic place
- Designated: 27 March 2009
- Reference no.: 123

Strand Arcade is an Italianate style shopping arcade of the late-Victorian and Edwardian era in Auckland, New Zealand. Located between Auckland's main thoroughfare, Queen Street, and Elliott Street, the arcade was originally built in 1899–1900. It was destroyed by a fire in 1909 and quickly rebuilt the following year. Strand Arcade was built around the time that the middle class was expanding in New Zealand and when shopping was emerging as a leisure activity.

The arcade is a category 1 historic place, assessed by Heritage New Zealand, which is awarded if a building has special cultural or historical significance.

== History ==
The Queen Street gully where Strand Arcade sits was known as Horotiu before 1840. In 1842, the land made part of a Crown Grant given to William Greenwood.

In 1899, the owner of the site, Arthur Myers, commissioned the construction of Strand Arcade. Myers was the managing director of the Campbell and Ehrenfried brewing and liquor business and had dedicated himself to commissioning significant communal civic buildings. The Strand Arcade was the second major shopping arcade in Auckland, following the now demolished Victoria Arcade on Queen Street.

Strand Arcade's construction process was covered extensively by the media. The New Zealand Observer reported that Myers had "beautified a portion of Queen-street that was rather an eyesore recently". The Italian-style building fed perceptions of Auckland as a prosperous place. Its connections with an international style were a source of pride for many Aucklanders and media tended to compare it with cities overseas. This fed into the pre-WWI competition between colonies within the British Empire towards a greater recognition. There was also constant reassurance by the media that the building's construction was in line with the latest technological advancements. Built at the turn of the century, there was a public desire for civic buildings such as Strand Arcade to represent modernity.

Construction took around one year. Upon opening, the ground floor walkway contained nineteen shops and the floors above held warehouses, sample rooms, fashion retailers, agents' offices and other small venues. The basement on the Elliott Street section contained offices for Albert Brewery. The site sat near the Smith and Caughey's department store as well as many other trade establishments.

On Tuesday, 16 August 1909, a large fire extensively damaged the arcade. The New Zealand Herald called it "one of the most destructive fires that Auckland has experienced for years." The arcade was rebuilt and re-opened in 1910. In 1914, the arcade became the head office of Campbell and Ehrenfried, Myer's brewing company. In 1974, Campbell and Ehrenfried left their offices in the arcade and it became the headquarters of Broadlands Dominion Group, a Challenge Corporation subsidiary. In 1993, the building was sold to the New Zealand Guardian Trust.

== Architecture ==
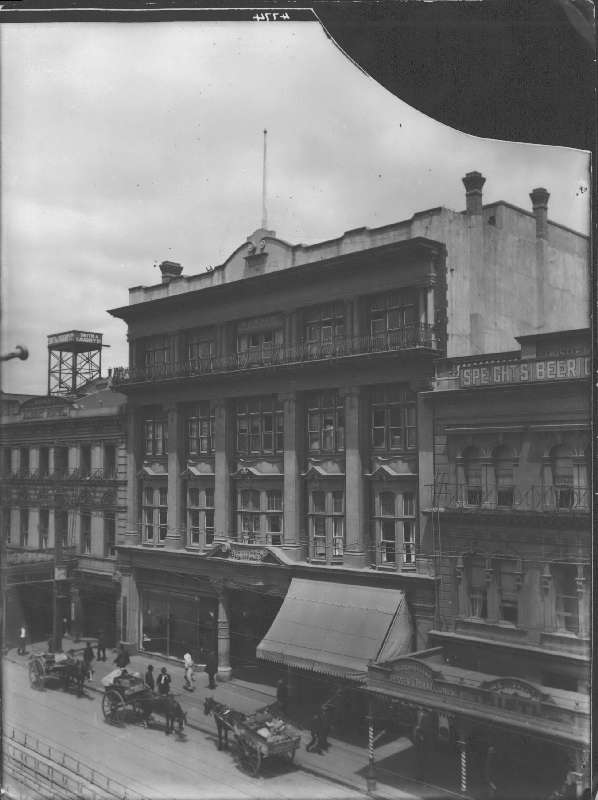
Strand Arcade, 1915. Auckland Museum Collections Online

Strand Arcade sits on a lot between Queen Street and Elliott Street, with entrances on either side and shopfronts facing both streets. The building's ornate Italianate style reflects architectural trends for commercial buildings of the late-Victorian and Edwardian eras. The four-storied building was recognised for its height, functionality and modern equipment. A glass-covered passageway linked Queen and Elliott Streets, setting a precedent for the modern shopping mall.

=== Rebuild ===
The arcade was rebuilt in 1909 after the fire by J. D. Jones. The building was rebuilt along similar lines but some significant changes were made. The Elliott Street side was increased from three to four storeys to match the Queen Street side. The Queen Street side's façade was given bay windows and a wrought-iron balcony to modernise the building. The rebuild was grand, reflecting the rising wealth and status of owner Arthur Myers, who served as mayor of Auckland from 1905 to 1909, and became a member of parliament in 1911.

== Heritage listing ==
The Strand Arcade received the heritage listing Historic Place Category One from Heritage New Zealand on 27 March 2009. It was noted for its aesthetic significance found in its ornate style and its value as one of the grandest and earliest surviving shopping arcades in New Zealand. Heritage New Zealand designated Strand Arcade as a representation of Auckland's commercial boom and the subsequent aspirations and activities of the middle class. They also emphasised that the arcade contributed to the image of Auckland as the "most important commercial centre in New Zealand in the early 1900s and beyond".

== After the 1990s ==
In the 1990s, the shift in popularity to suburban shopping malls saw Strand Arcade undergo a commercial restructuring. The building was subdivided in 2003; the basement and ground floor remained in retail and hospitality and the upper floors were adapted to various private uses.

Due to building compliance issues that occurred around 2018, Strand Arcade has multiple vacant spaces, with a couple of retail stores open and some shops only open by appointment. It took part in Heart of the City Auckland's Vacant Spaces Initiative, in which the vacant store front windows were decorated with installations detailing the building's heritage.

== Gallery ==
Exterior

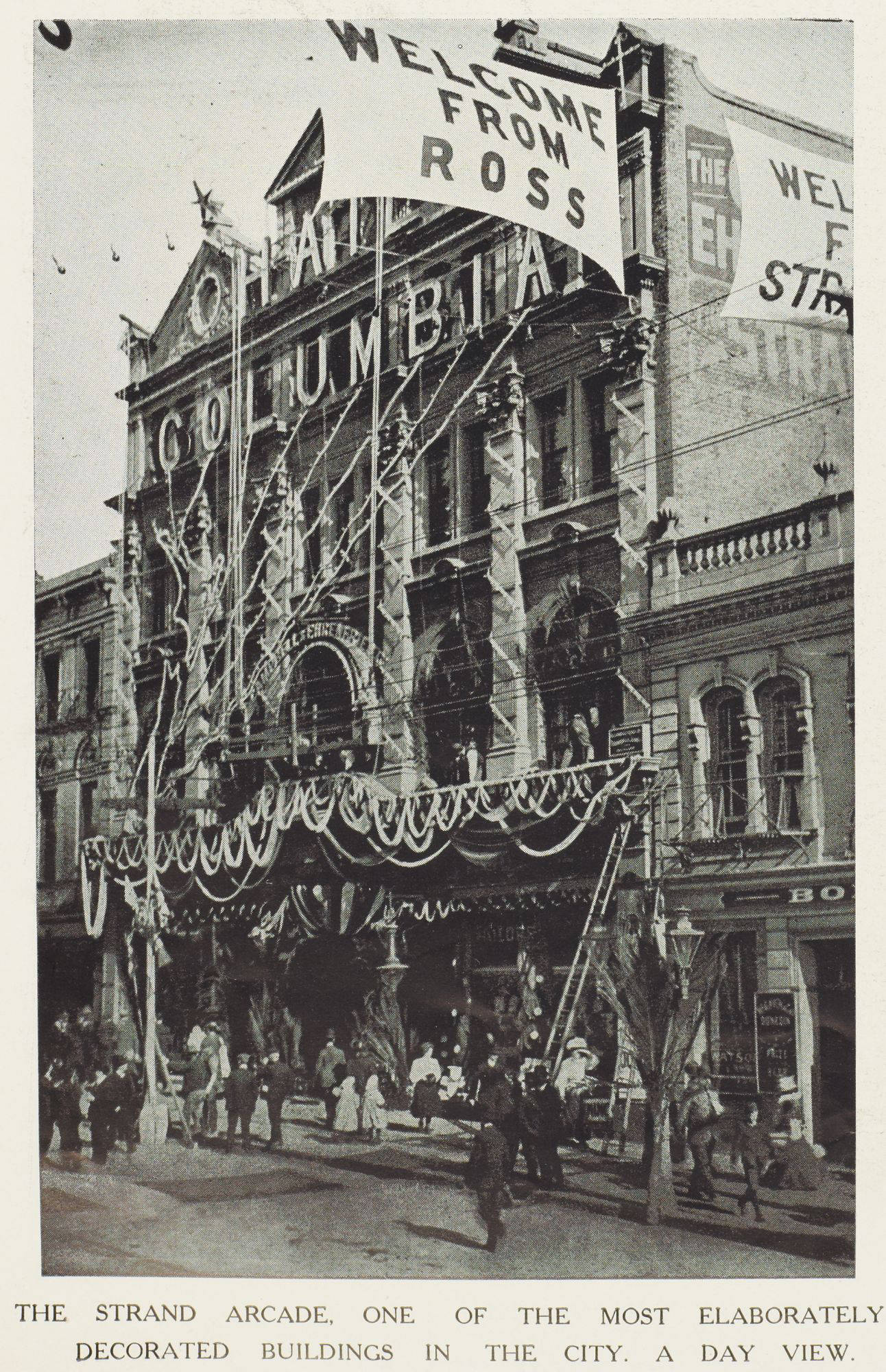
Strand Arcade decorated for a visit by an American battleship fleet, 1908

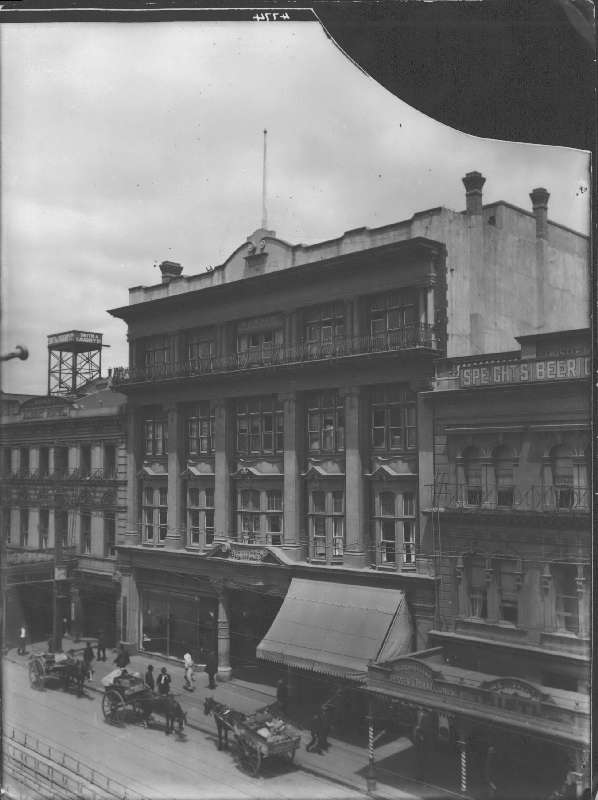
Exterior view in 1915

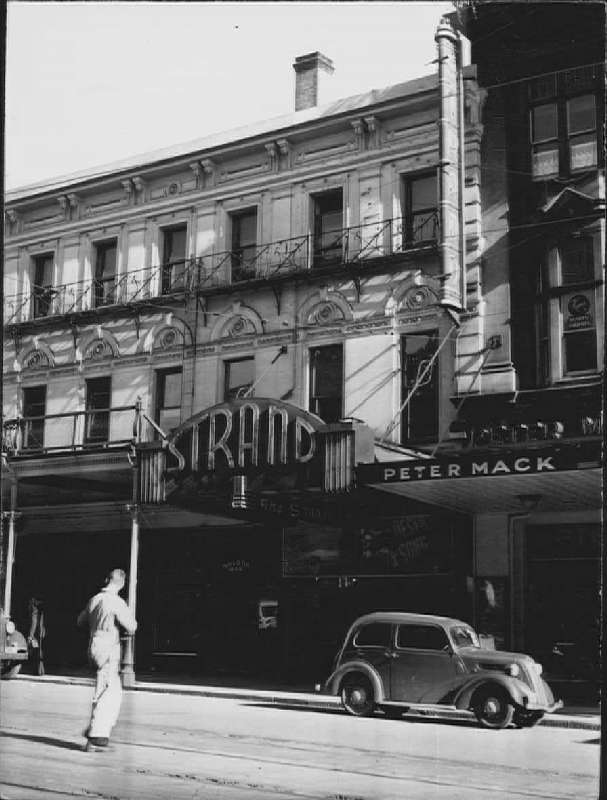
Exterior view in the 1930s

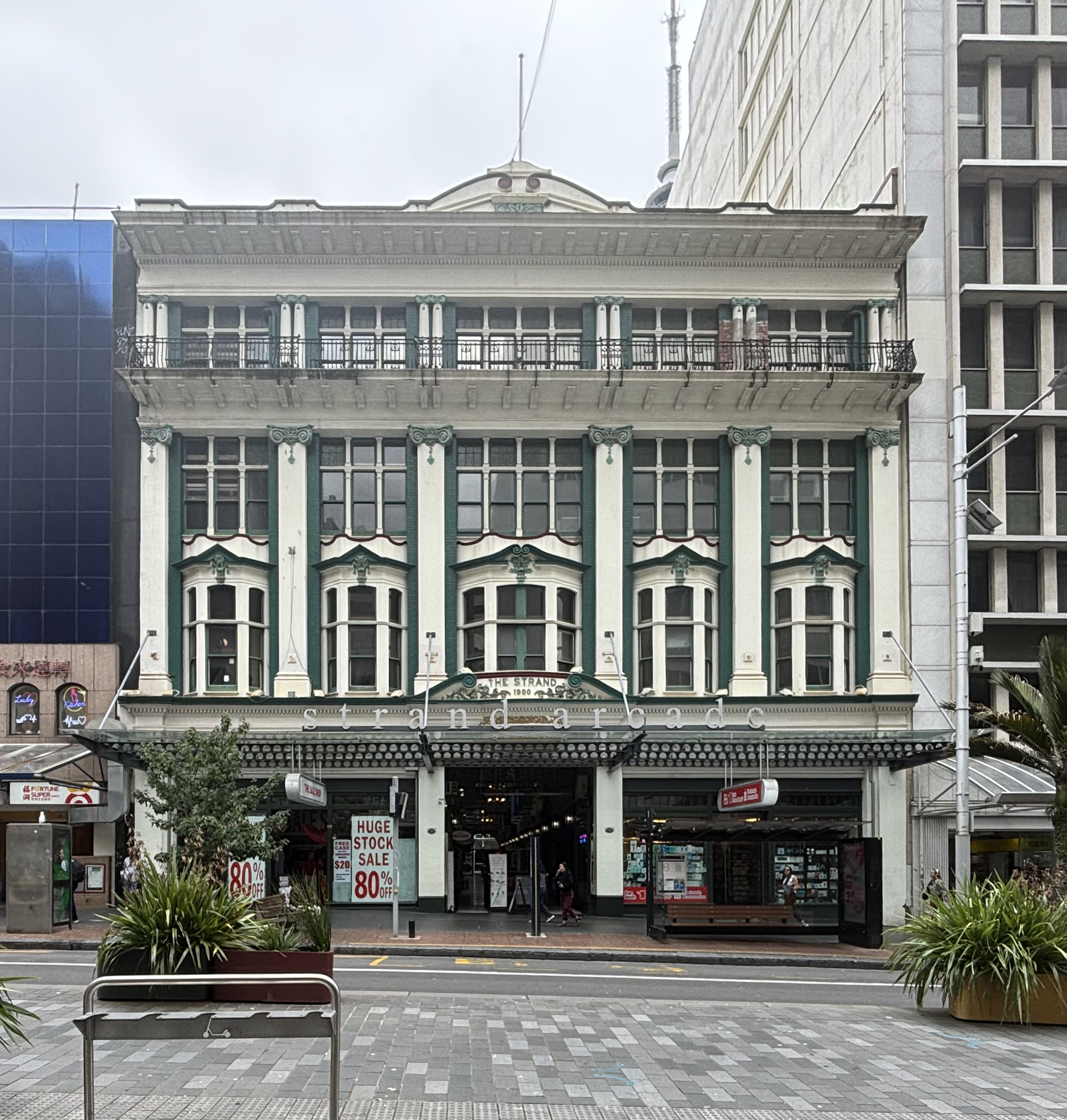
Queen Street frontage, 2026

Interior

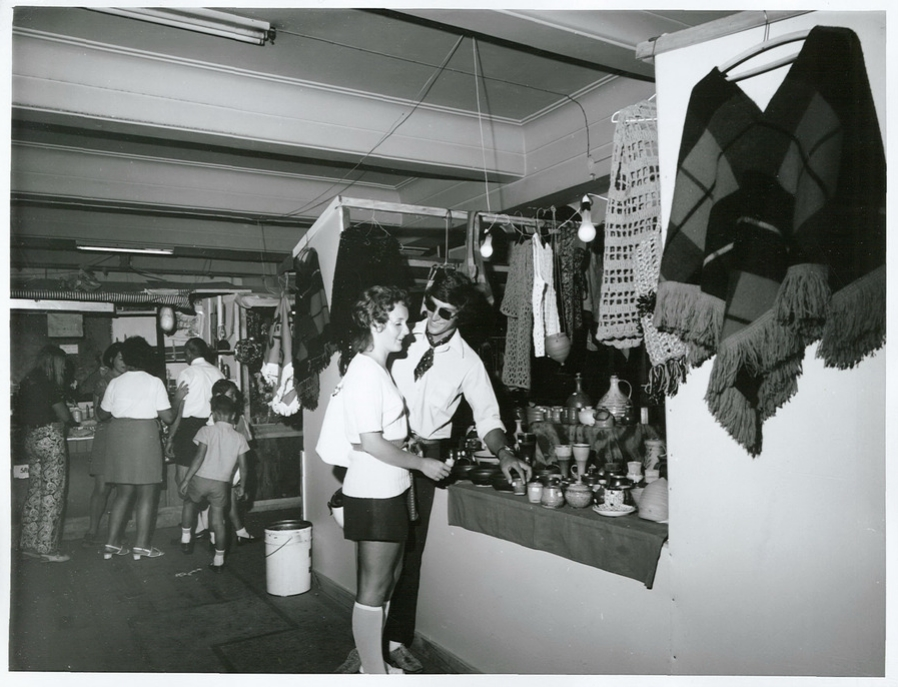
Shop inside Strand Arcade, 1970

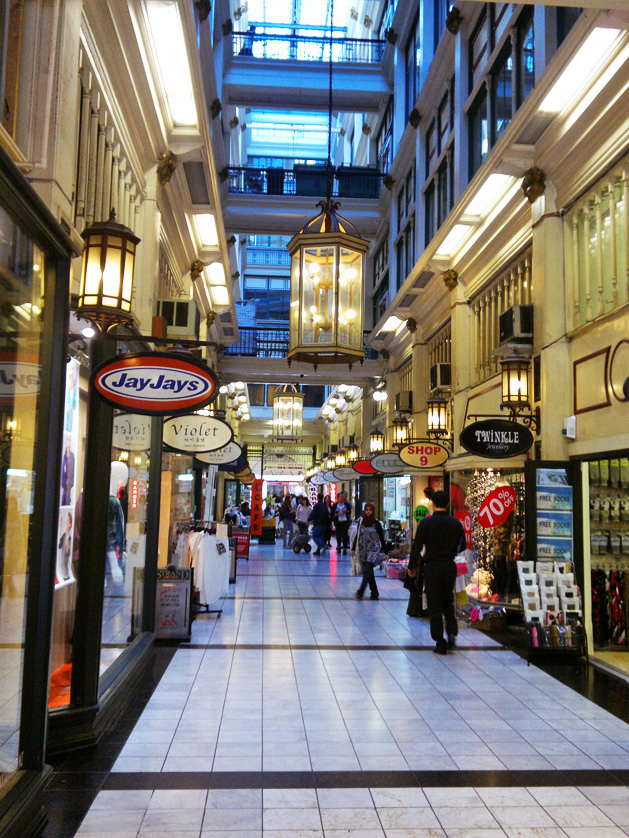
Interior view in 2012

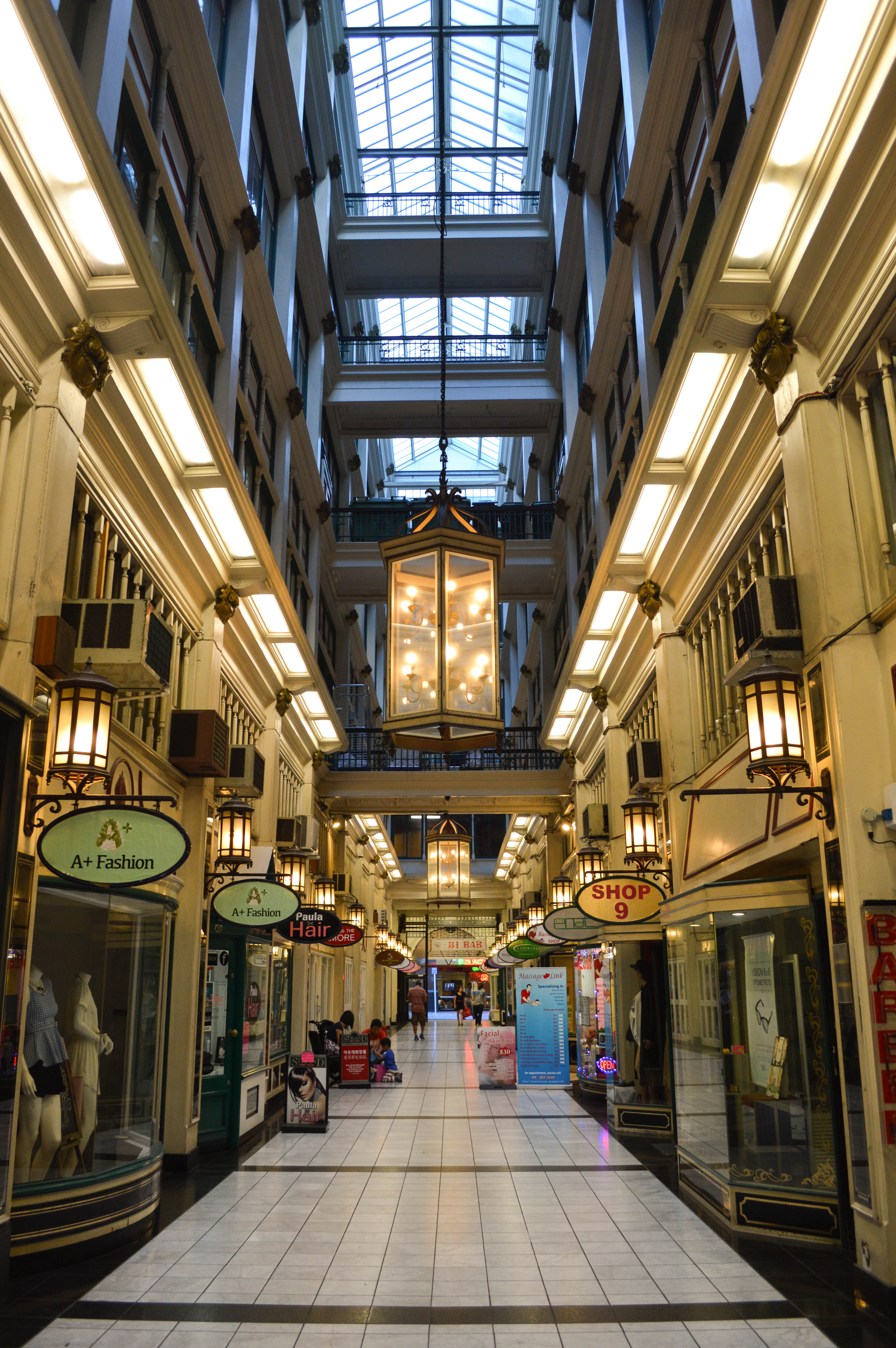
Interior and ceiling view, 2015
