= Occidental Hotel, Vulcan Lane =

Historic pub and hotel in New Zealand

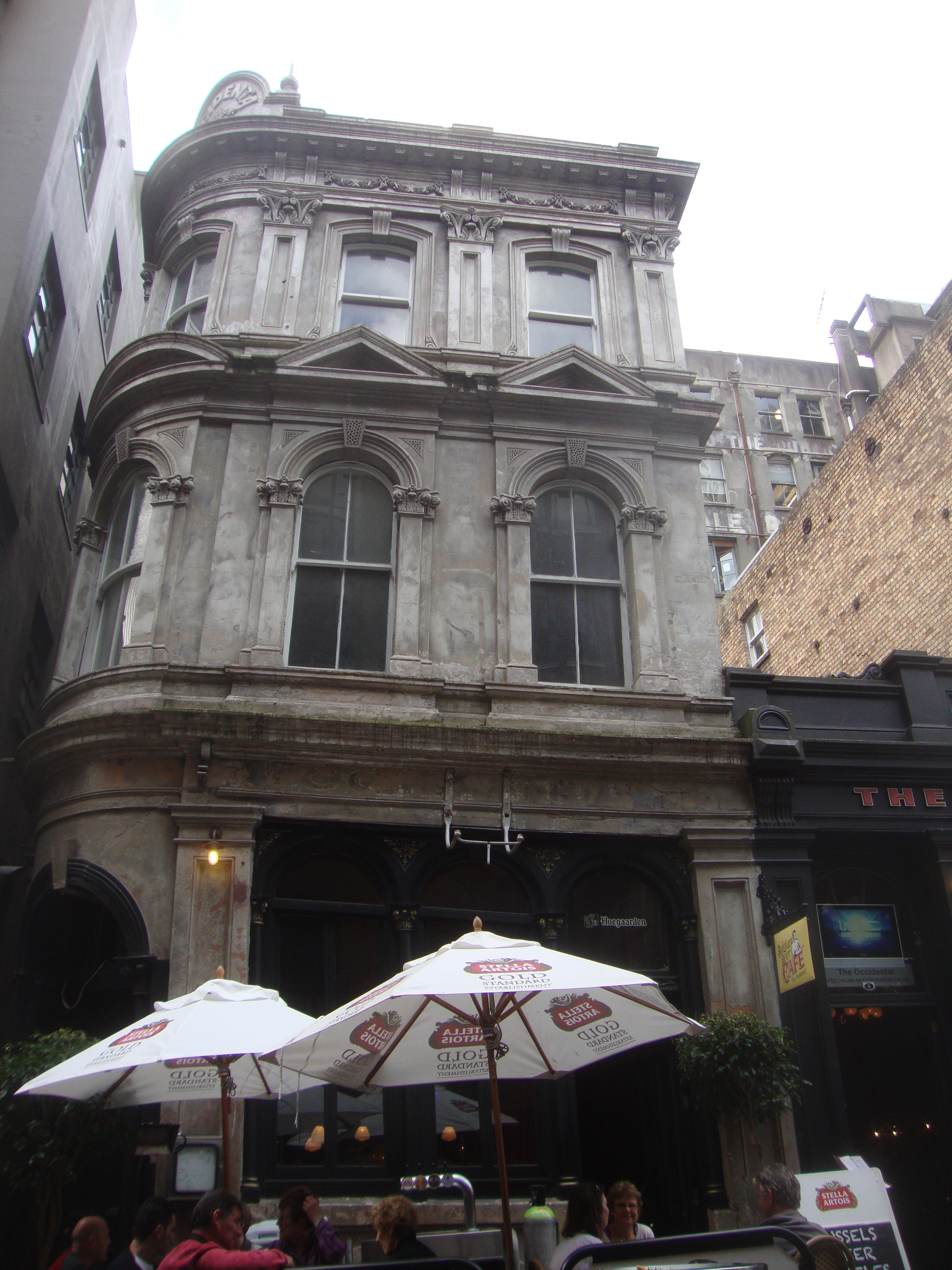
- The Occidental Hotel
- Interactive map of the Occidental Hotel, Vulcan Lane area

General information
- Architectural style: Victorian Italianate
- Location: 6-8 Vulcan Lane, Auckland, New Zealand
- Coordinates: 36°50′48.83″S 174°45′58.94″E
- Construction started: 1870
- Opened: July 1870

Heritage New Zealand – Category 1
- Designated: 7 July 1987
- Reference no.: 624

The Occidental Hotel on Vulcan Lane in Auckland City Centre, is a Heritage New Zealand category 1 historic place and one of the oldest hotels in Auckland.

== History ==
Construction of the original Occidental Hotel began in May 1870, renovating an existing building used previously by a bookbinder. It was built on what was original the site of a forge for blacksmith, James McLeod.

It opened in July 1870 and run by a former American sailor Edward Perkins. He housed within the hotel a museum of art, including a thousand portraits of celebrities, and other objects. Perkins sold the lease for twelve months in April 1874 to tour the United States of America with his new wife, and finally sold the business in 1879.

The building was then demolished and rebuilt in 1884. The rebuilt hotel was designed by E. Mahoney and Sons.

From the opening and into the 1920s, it was well known as a location for bookmakers, and was home for a while to the Auckland Tattersall's Club. The Occidental Hotel was popular with journalists and printmakers as there was a high concentration in the area of publishing and printing houses through to the late 1800s. It was also an early meeting place for the lesbian community.

It competed for trade with the older Queen's Ferry Hotel, also on Vulcan Lane, and both were a subject of a more recent dispute in 2007, which saw both pub's assets frozen. The Occidental Hotel remained a pub, bar and/or restaurant throughout numerous changes in ownership and publicans, and is still a bar to this day.

== Description ==
The Occidental Hotel is a three-storey Victorian corner pub in an ornate Italianate style. The interior previously housed a reading room, billiard room and café as well as the bar. The entrance was originally through a corner doorway that faced Queen Street, and there is a shield over the parapet on the corner which includes the name of "Occidental."

The ground and first floor have "round arched windows with Corinthian colonettes" and the top storey has "segmental arched windows set between Corinthian pilasters" with a plaster frieze and parapet above

There were several renovations and modifications to the building's interior, including in 1876, when it is thought that a billiard room opened in an annex to the main hotel. The exterior was left largely unmodified. There were further recorded modifications in 1936, with alterations to the interior including an extension to the bar and new stairs from ground to first floors, and 1960, with further modernisations to the bar, and the installation of a false ceiling.
