= Bluestone Store =

1861-built warehouse building in downtown Auckland

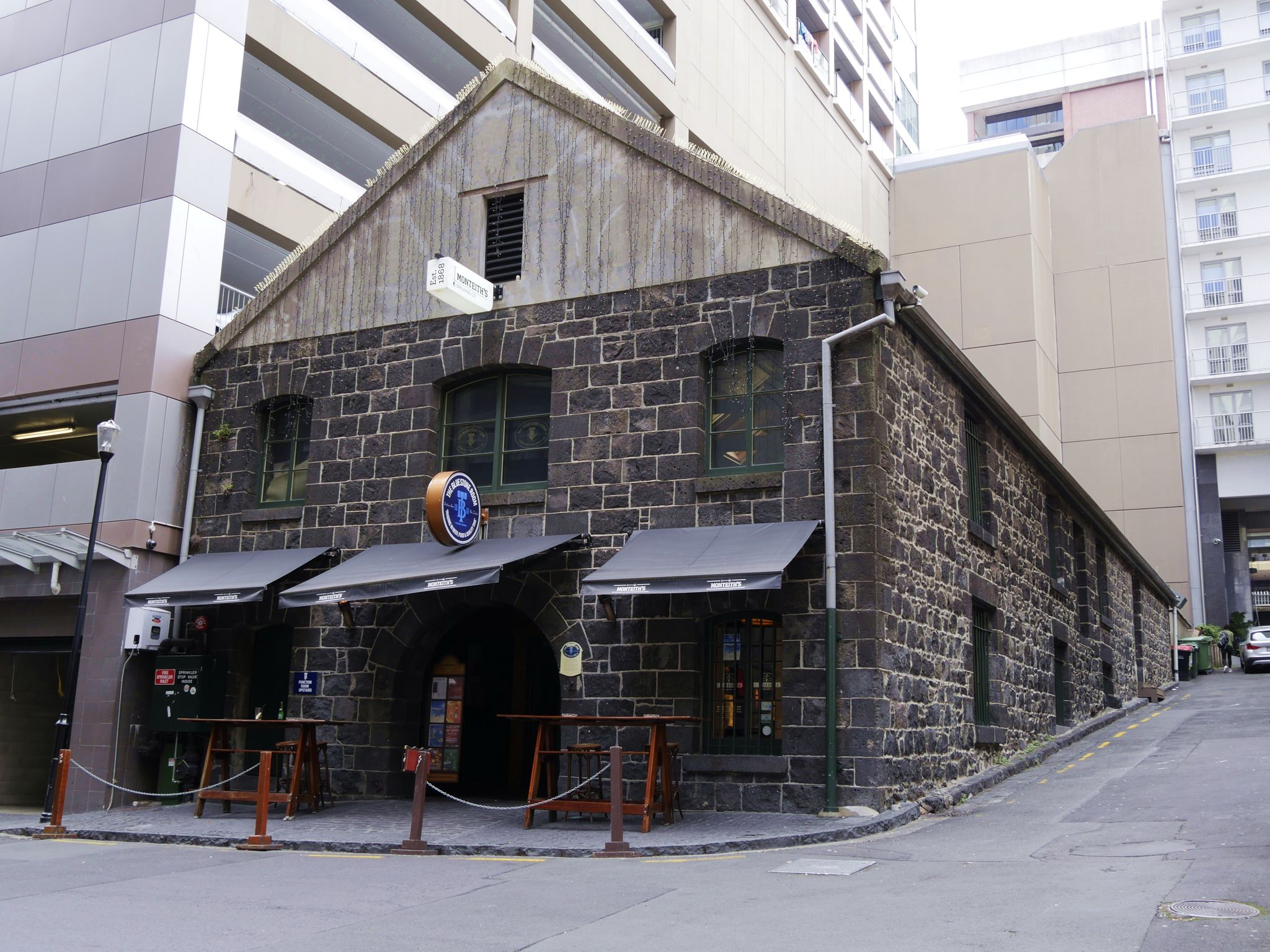
- The Bluestone Store in 2017

General information
- Location: 9-11 Durham Lane, Auckland
- Coordinates: 36°50′51″S 174°45′53″E

Heritage New Zealand – Category 1
- Designated: 7 July 1987
- Reference no.: 2647

The Bluestone Store is a warehouse building in the Auckland City Centre of New Zealand. Built in 1861, the warehouse operated as the Bluestone Room, a pub and restaurant, from 2003 until 2020. The building was added to the List of category 1 Historic Places (list of protected buildings and places) by the New Zealand Historic Places Trust on 2 July 1987. It is the oldest surviving stone building in Auckland.

== Geography ==
The building is located on Durham Lane, between Queen Street and Albert Street in the Auckland city centre. Since the building is surrounded by high apartment towers, parking garages and hotels and is located in a cul-de-sac, it is not easy to find without local knowledge.

== Architecture ==
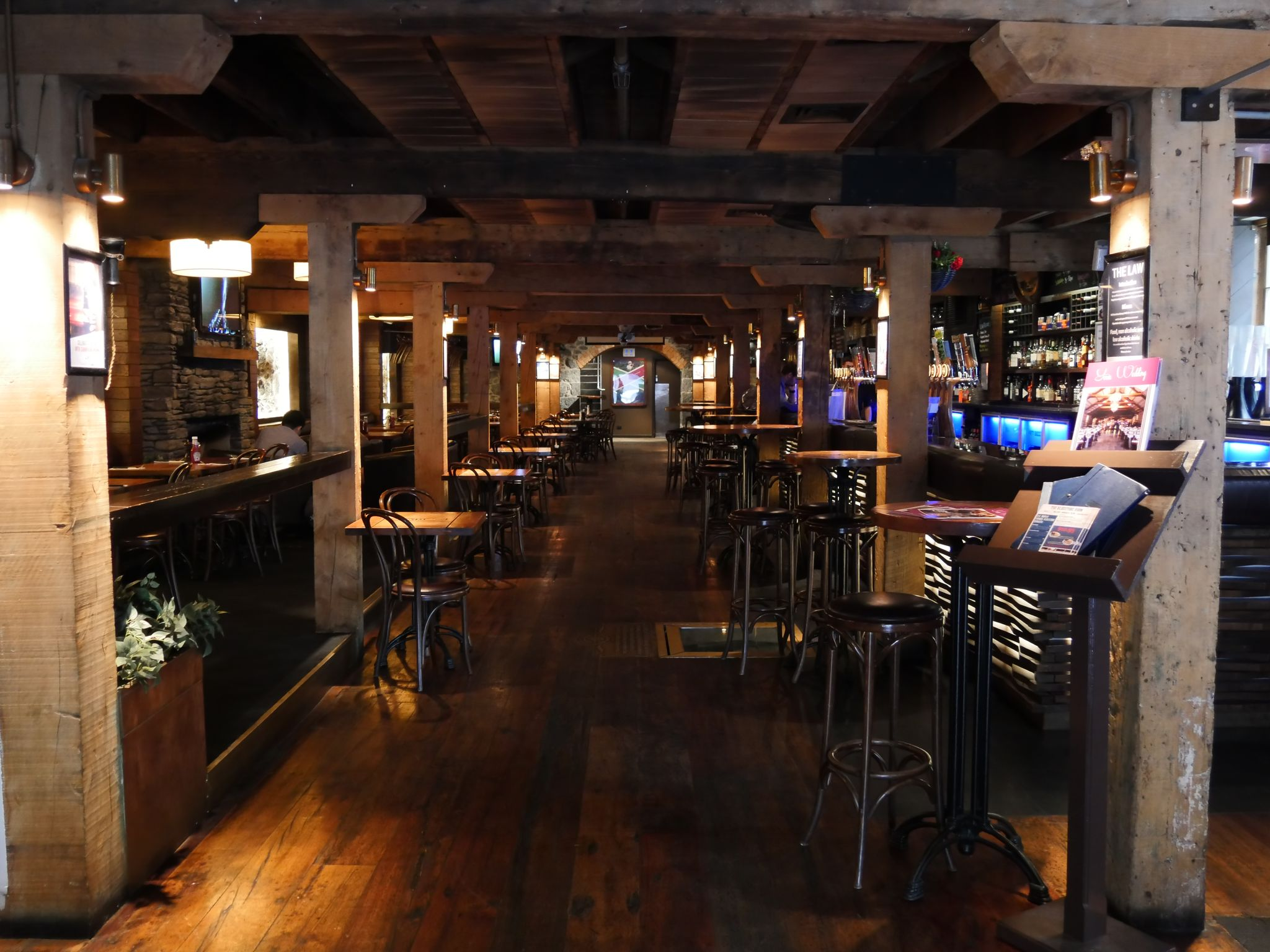
Interior of the Bluestone Store in 2017

The Bluestone Store is a simple two-story building made of the blue basalt stone of sourced from Maungarei / Mount Wellington. It is built into the slope of a hill, meaning the upper floor reaches the ground towards the end of the building. The front of the building is symmetrical, with an archway in the middle. The floors and the internal structure of the building are made of wood. Inside the building, there is a plaque on the floor that commemorates the site of Auckland's first drinking water spring.

== History ==
The site where the Bluestone Store stands today may have previously been the site of a wooden house. The property was sold by the British Crown to a European settler in 1842. In 1861, the stone building was finally built as a warehouse by the firm Levy & Goldwater, owned by the warehouse managers Bernhard Levy and Nathan Goldwater. The architect was Reader Gilson Wood, born in Leicestershire, England, who also worked as an architect for the colonial government from 1849.

In 1865, Levy & Goldwater leased the building to the auctioneers Charles Emmison Knapp and Morton Jones. In 1878, the confectioner Edward Waters acquired the building, followed by the grain merchant Jakins & Wilcox. In 1882, the New Zealand Insurance Company took over ownership, and four years later, until 1919, the store may have been used to store coal to operate Brown's Mill. Department store owner John Court was another owner of the building, which was sold in 1936 to Kiwi Polish, who used the building as a manufacturing and sales facility.

L.W. Twist was the new owner from 1963, who used the top floor as a customs office and rented the lower area to Top Twenty Promotions, who operated a coffee bar there. Later the Bluestone Store was converted into a night club, which operated under various names over the years. After another renovation, it was reopened as Granny's, giving various bands the opportunity to perform.

By 1977/78, the building was in a run-down state and was at risk of demolition. When future Prime Minister Helen Clark became Minister of Conservation in the Labour government under Geoffrey Palmer in 1987, one of her first measures was to issue a Protection Order, which secured the building for the time being. However, it took another 16 years before the building could be protected by structural measures.

At the beginning of 2003, the renovation work was estimated to cost NZ$445,000. In June of that year, the new owner, the Rheingold Parking Company, took over the restoration of the building, including the earthquake protection measures. The architect of the project at the time was Dave Pearson. In 2003 the building was reopened as the Bluestone Room, a bar and restaurant, and closed during the COVID-19 pandemic in New Zealand in 2020.
