= The Dining Hall and Waitoa Room of the College of St John the Evangelist =

Two historic places in Auckland, New Zealand

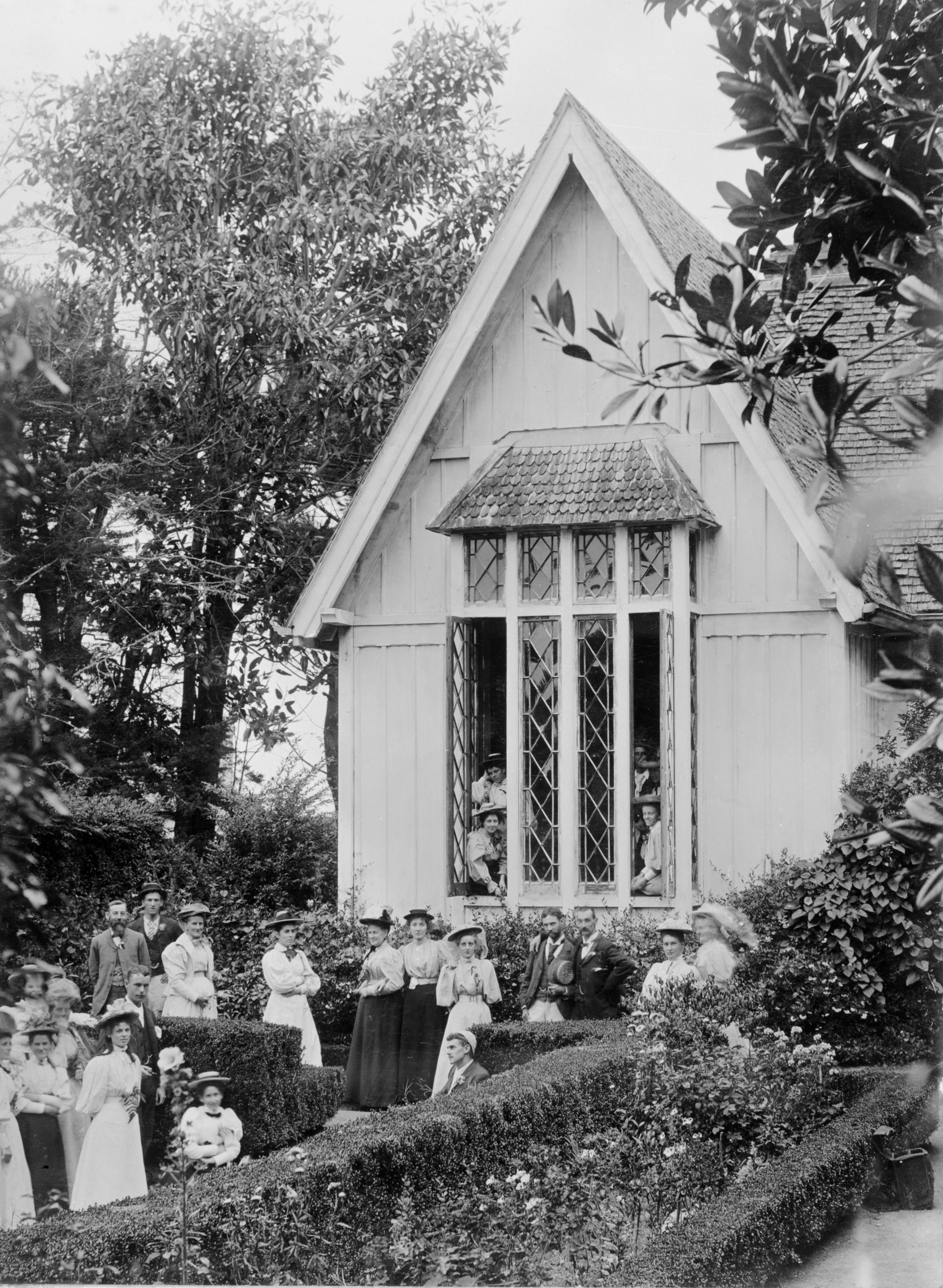
- The Oriel Window of the Dining Hall of St John's College in 1896
- Interactive map of the The Dining Hall and Waitoa Room of the College of St John the Evangelist area

General information
- Architectural style: Gothic Revival
- Location: 188-226 St Johns Road, Meadowbank, New Zealand
- Coordinates: 36°52′24.25″S 174°50′27.23″E
- Construction started: 1845

Design and construction
- Architects: Sampson Kempthorne and Frederick Thatcher

Heritage New Zealand – Category 1
- Designated: 6 June 1983
- Reference no.: 14

The Dining Hall and Waitoa Room of the College of St John the Evangelist are two buildings that were built between 1845 and 1849 for the College of St John the Evangelist and are Heritage New Zealand category 1 historic places in Auckland.

== History ==
The Dining Hall and Waitoa Room (formerly the kitchen) are two of three original buildings still standing that formed part of the College of St John the Evangelist, also known as St John's College, in Auckland.

From 1842, the College was initially in Te Waimate until Sampson Kempthorne was commissioned by Bishop George Selwyn to build St John's College in Auckland. It had been estimated that the new buildings on the site would cost £500, and were to be built of stone. The first stages of the building were the kitchen, now the Waitoa Room, and a two-storey, sixteen-room house.

Frederick Thatcher was appointed to a role of architect for the college and he oversaw the completion of the first stages of building, firstly, under Kempthorne and then taking over after Kempthorne returned to England. These two buildings had used nearly half of the £500 budget, and for the rest of the building on site, Thatcher used timber. During this period, Reader Wood, another architect, was employed as superintendent of the building project and George Hunter, a carpenter, was employed full time at the college.

In 1847, the college chapel was built, and between 1846 and 1848, a hospital, college workshops, school houses, a school master's house, and servants' houses were built. From October 1848 to July 1849, Thatcher oversaw the design and building of the dining hall. Only the chapel, kitchen and dining hall still stand today.

In 1849, the completion of the dining hall's construction, was marked with a dinner with Governor and Lady Grey and a hundred other guests. The dining hall was Thatcher's last construction at St John's College.

The kitchen was renamed the Waitoa Room, named after the first Māori priest to be trained at St John's College, Rota Waitoa, and now acts as a common room.

== Description ==
The dining room is H-shaped in its plan, and has a "dais at one end lighted by a large and very beautiful oriel window." The framing of the building is on the interior, with "vertical boards and battens on the exterior being unbroken except by doors and windows and some decorative cross bracing." This interior framing is unlike Thatcher's earlier buildings, including the chapel, but the dining hall still has the expected steep-pitched roof. The interior framing was then continued on later churches that Thatcher designed.

The kitchen, now the Waitoa Room, is the only remaining stone building on site. It was a simple rectangular plan, made from "local scoria laid in rubble courses" with a timber roof. It also connects to the dining hall.

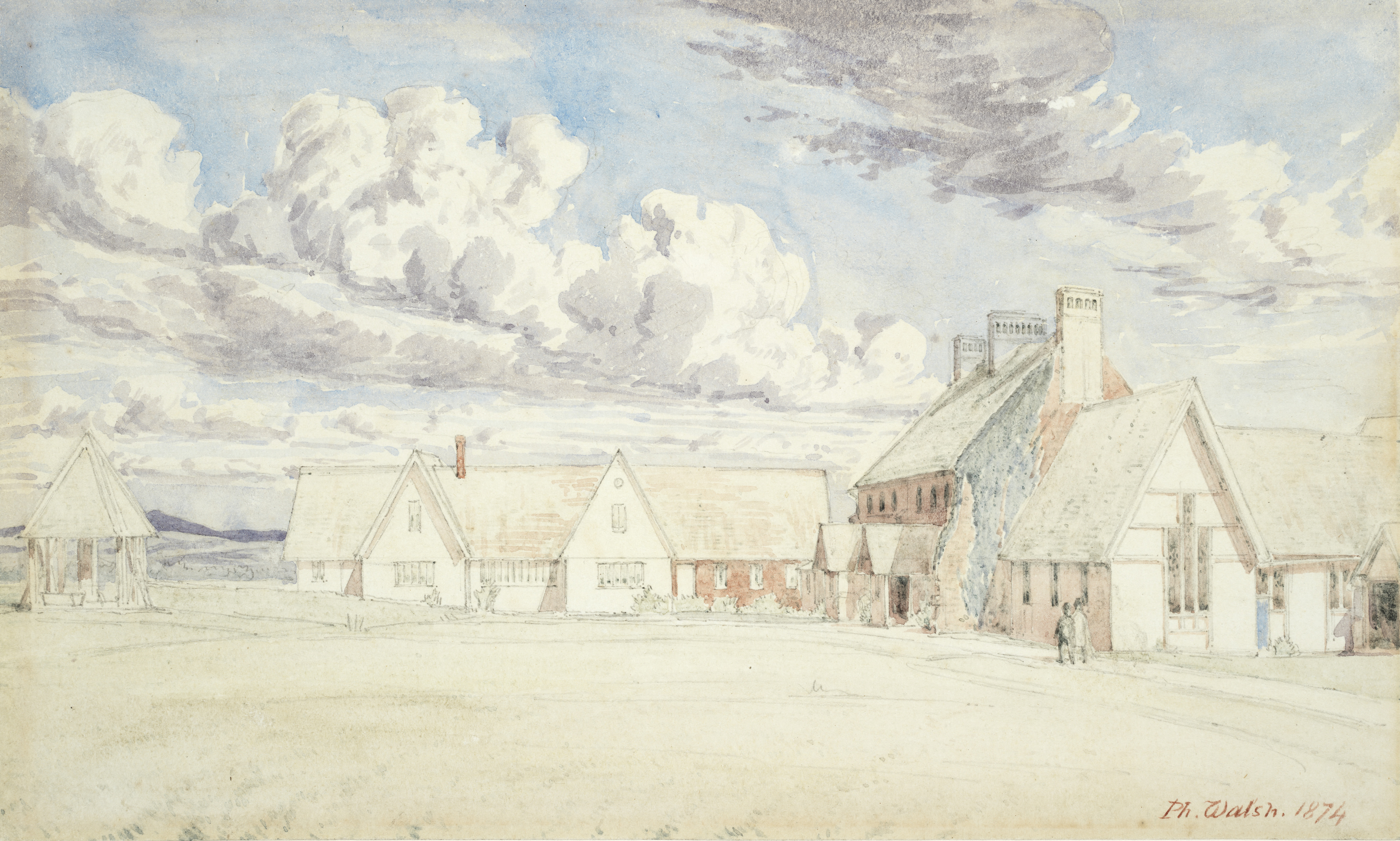
Walsh Philip, St John's College, 1874.
