= First World War Memorial Beacon =

War memorial in Auckland, New Zealand

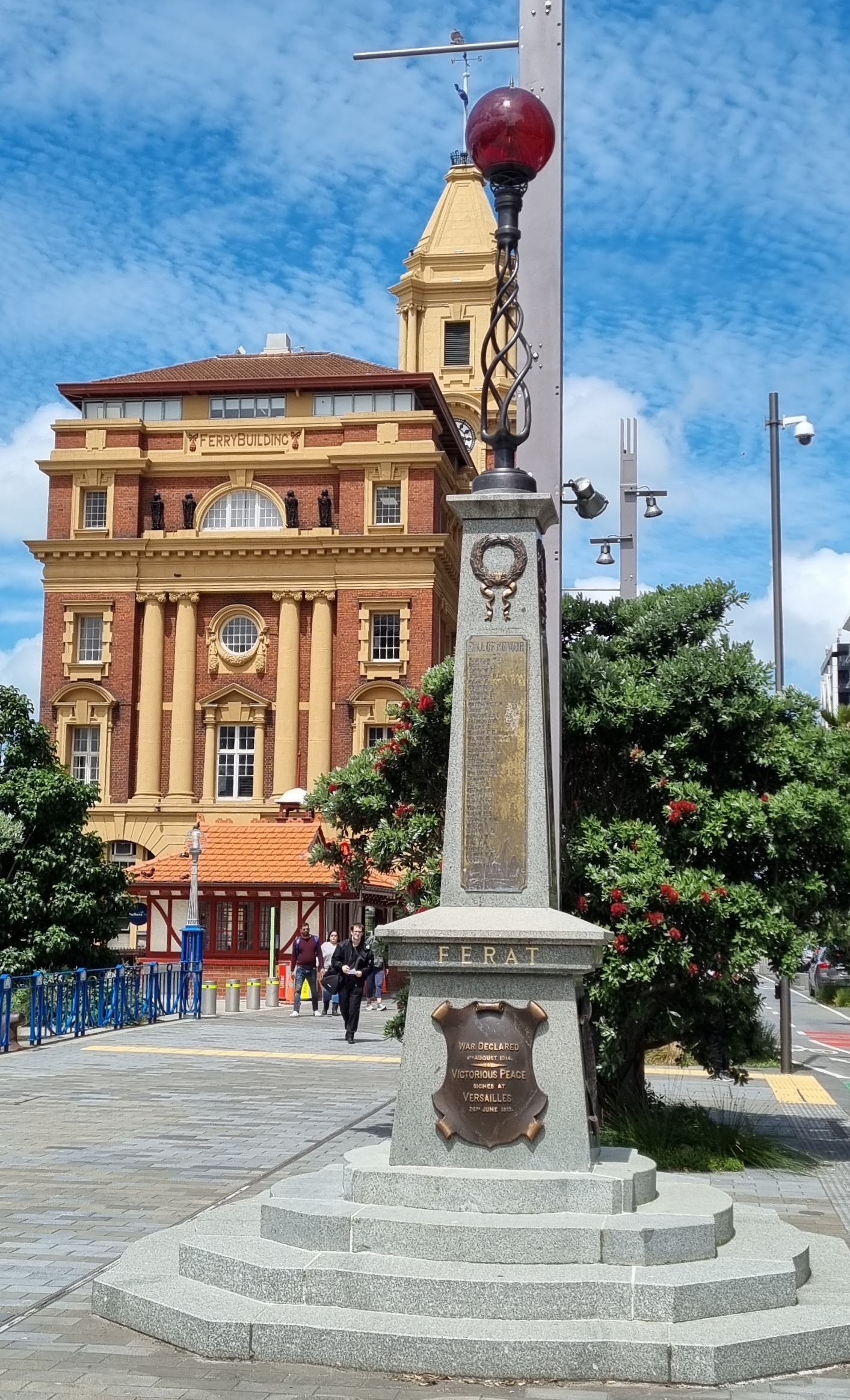
- Memorial Beacon in 2022
- Interactive map of First World War Memorial Beacon
- Location: Quay Street, Auckland, New Zealand
- Coordinates: 36°50′34″S 174°45′57″E
- Designer: William Henry Hamer
- Material: Granite; ironwork; bronze; glass
- Height: 5.8 metres (19 ft)
- Opening date: 17 December 1915
- Restored date: 2000, 2022

Heritage New Zealand – Category 1
- Designated: 11 November 2023
- Reference no.: 9652

The First World War Memorial Beacon is a war memorial on Quay Street in Auckland, the largest city in New Zealand. New Zealand's first built World War I memorial, it was first unveiled in 1915, before being lost in the 1960s. It was rediscovered and restored in 1999–2000, at which time it was placed outside the New Zealand Maritime Museum. It was further restored in 2021–2022 and returned to its original, and present, location. The memorial was designated a category 1 historic place by Heritage New Zealand in 2023.

== History ==
In 1915, the Auckland Harbour Board (AHB) created the Quay Street West extension scheme to modernise the port. During this development, nearby wharves were used to load troops and supplies to the front, and many employees of the AHB enlisted and left New Zealand for war from the harbour.

At a meeting on 21 September 1915, the AHB approved the construction of the memorial, with an estimated budget of £250, after two designs were proposed by the AHB's chief engineer, William Henry Hamer. The selected design consisted of a Coromandel granite obelisk with bronze plaques and wreaths on each face, topped with decorative ironwork holding an electric lamp, with an overall height of 5.8 metres (19 ft). As well as being symbolic, the beacon was also designed to guide ferries on their approach to the new moorings west of the Ferry Building. A red lamp surmounted the memorial, and a green light was to be installed on the Sailors' Home at the corner of Albert and Sturdee Streets.

The memorial was dedicated on 17 December 1915, and was New Zealand's first built World War I memorial, erected while ANZAC troops were still in Gallipoli. The AHB intended the memorial beacon to include the names of all of its employees who enlisted for war service, not just those who were killed, which is uncommon for a war memorial. The beacon also had the symbolic role of guiding troop ships home from the war. The combination of beacon and war memorial is unique in New Zealand and one of very few memorials of its kind in the world.

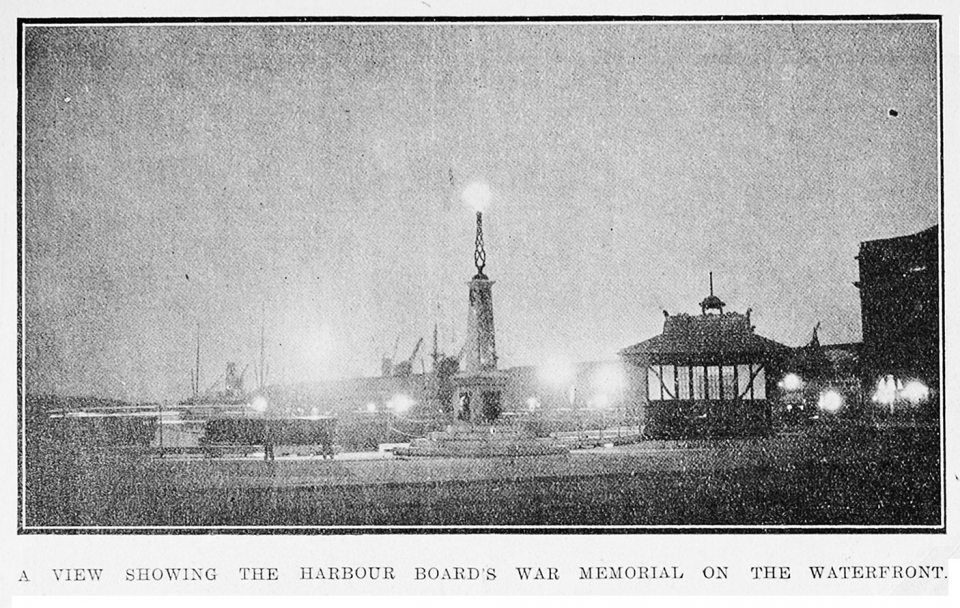
The memorial beacon in 1922

The memorial beacon was designed as a living memorial, and more information including the honour roll and other plaques were added during and after the war. In 1969, foreshore reclamation and the creation of the downtown shopping centre as well as the marginalisation of war memorials and commemorations saw the memorial beacon put into storage. The memorial would not be found again for thirty years, in 1999, while the original ironwork and orb were never recovered.

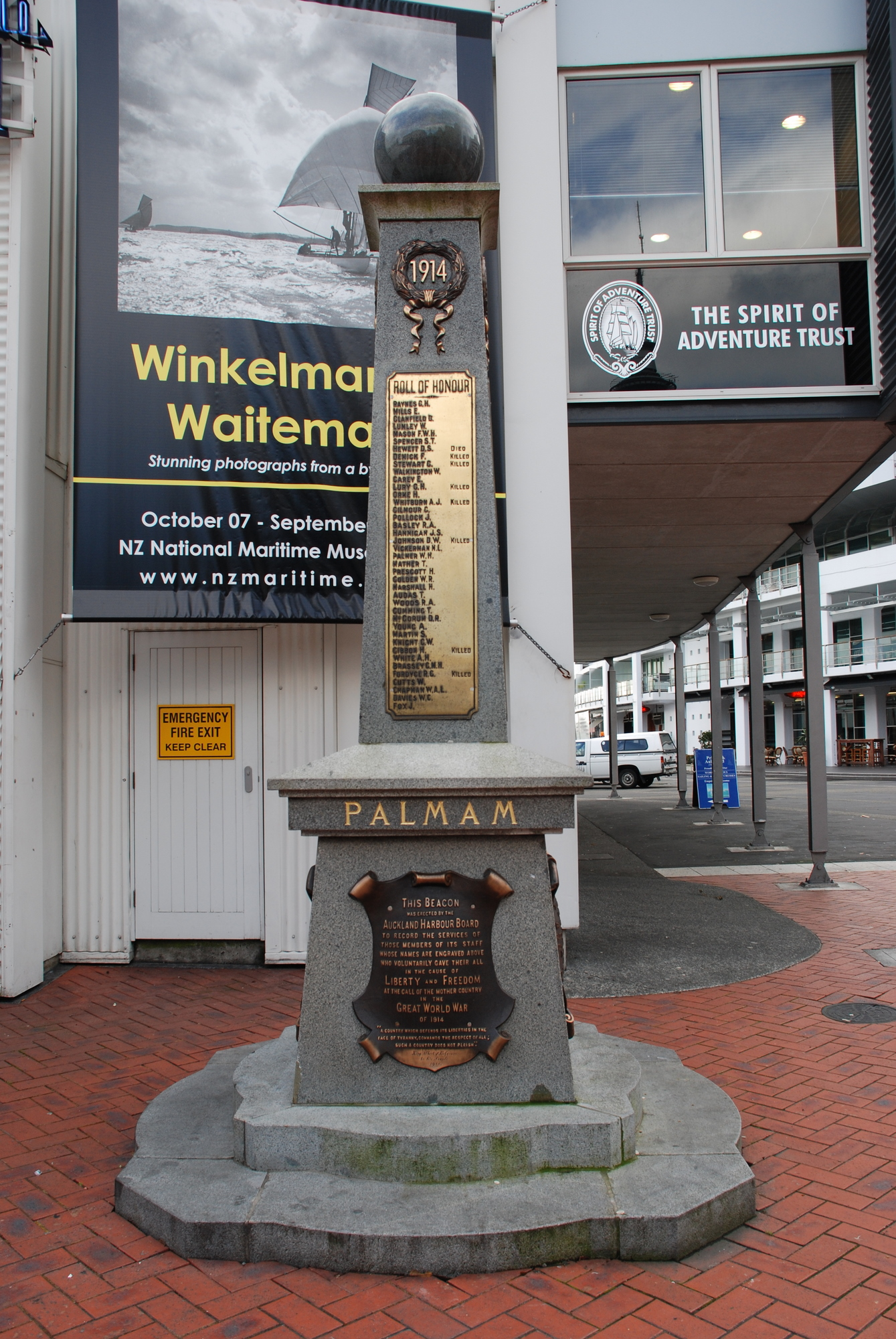
The partially restored memorial beacon outside the New Zealand Maritime Museum in 2008

An anonymous Jewish immigrant, who had been a refugee from Nazi Germany, paid for the restoration of the memorial. A plaque was added to the memorial stating "Restored and re-erected in the year 2000 by a grateful refugee from Nazi Germany". The partially restored memorial, without the spire and orb, was placed outside the New Zealand Maritime New Zealand in 2000.

In 2022, the memorial was fully restored, including replacing the glass orb that had once sat at the top of the memorial. A new orb was hand-blown in Taupō by local craftspeople as a replica of the original. DPA Architects, working with steel artisans from Devonport, recreated the original spire using modern 3D modelling technology.

On 29 November 2022, the glass orb and ironwork spire were returned to the memorial beacon, and the memorial was reinstated close to its original placement, opposite Commercial Bay on Quay Street.

== Composition ==
The memorial beacon comprises an obelisk made of Coromandel granite, with decorative ironwork and electric lamp, which was uncommon for the time when much of the country still lacked electricity. The bronze shields and brass plates include information about the memorial as well as the honour roll for soldiers who served or died in World War I.

=== Inscription ===
The Latin motto Palmam qui meruit ferat is inscribed around the top of the pedestal on the four sides of the memorial, and can be translated as "Let him bear away the palm who has deserved it".

Image	Inscription
	PALMAM This Beacon was erected by the Auckland Harbour Board to record the services of those members of its staff whose names are engraved above who voluntarily gave their all in the cause of Liberty and Freedom at the call of the mother country in the Great World War of 1914 "A country which defends its liberties in the face of tyranny, commands the respect of all; such a country does not perish." King Albert of Belgium to his People 1914
	QUI Battle Honours. Samoa Egypt. Gallipoli. France. Belgium. Palestine. Mesopotamia; German E. & W. Africa. Italy. Russia. Austria. The Balkan States. the occupation of Germany. and The Seven Seas.
	MERUIT restored and re-erected in the year 2000 by a grateful refugee from nazi germany
	FERAT War Declared; 4th August 1914. Victorious Peace signed at Versailles 26th June 1919.

== Reception ==
Attitudes towards the memorial have shifted over the years since the memorial's inception.

Its removal into storage in 1969 rather than placement at another public location may have been related to anti-war sentiments of the 1960s and 1970s. By the time of its rediscovery in 1999, there was more desire for commemoration of war. When the memorial was fully refurbished in 2021-2022 there was great pride and care in its restoration, with Director of Auckland Council's Downtown Programme Eric van Essen describing the "opportunity to restore an important part of the city's history" as an "honour for the team."

The memorial was also recently upgraded from a category 2 to category 1 historic place.

== Gallery ==
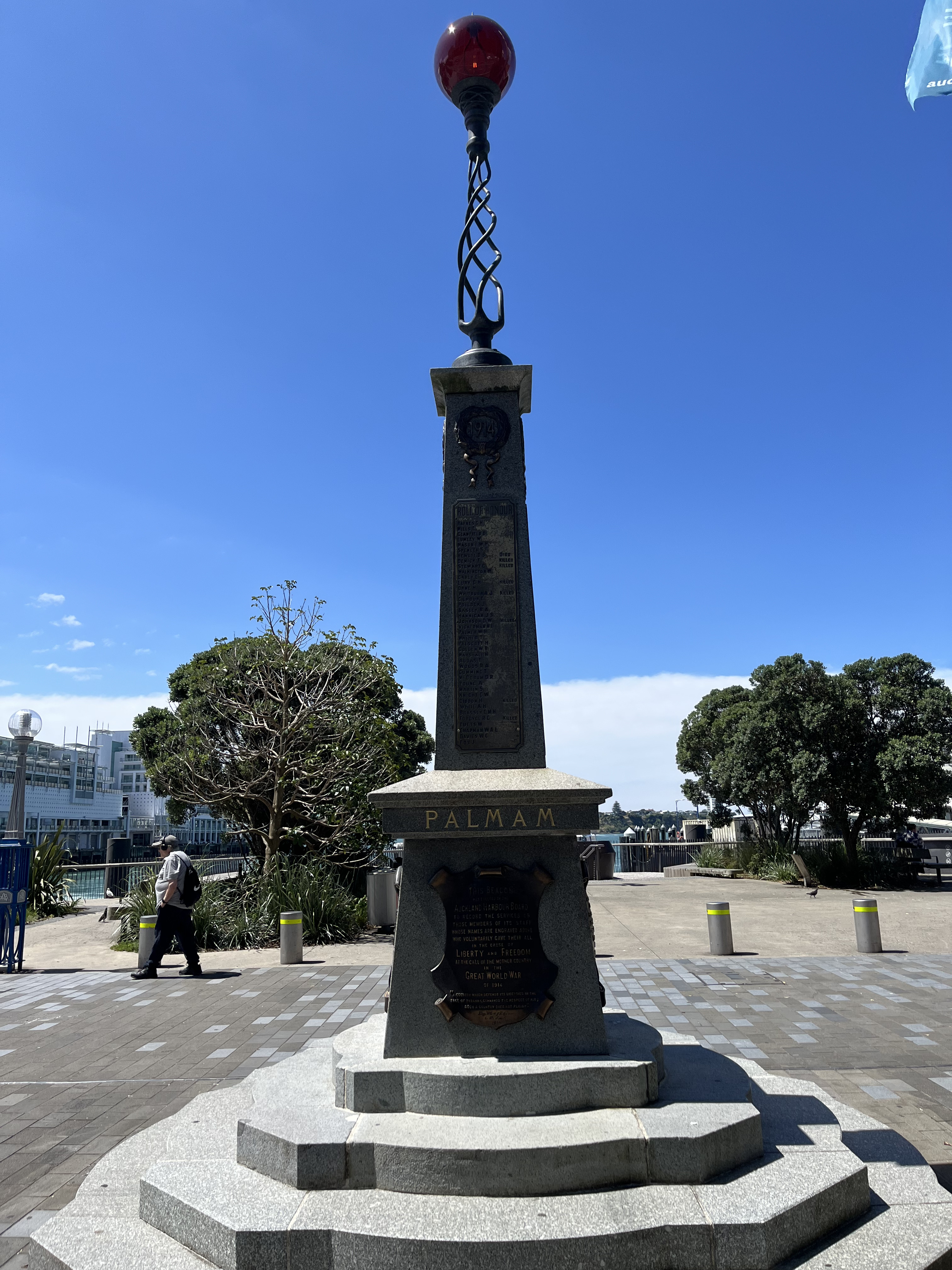
South elevation (2024)

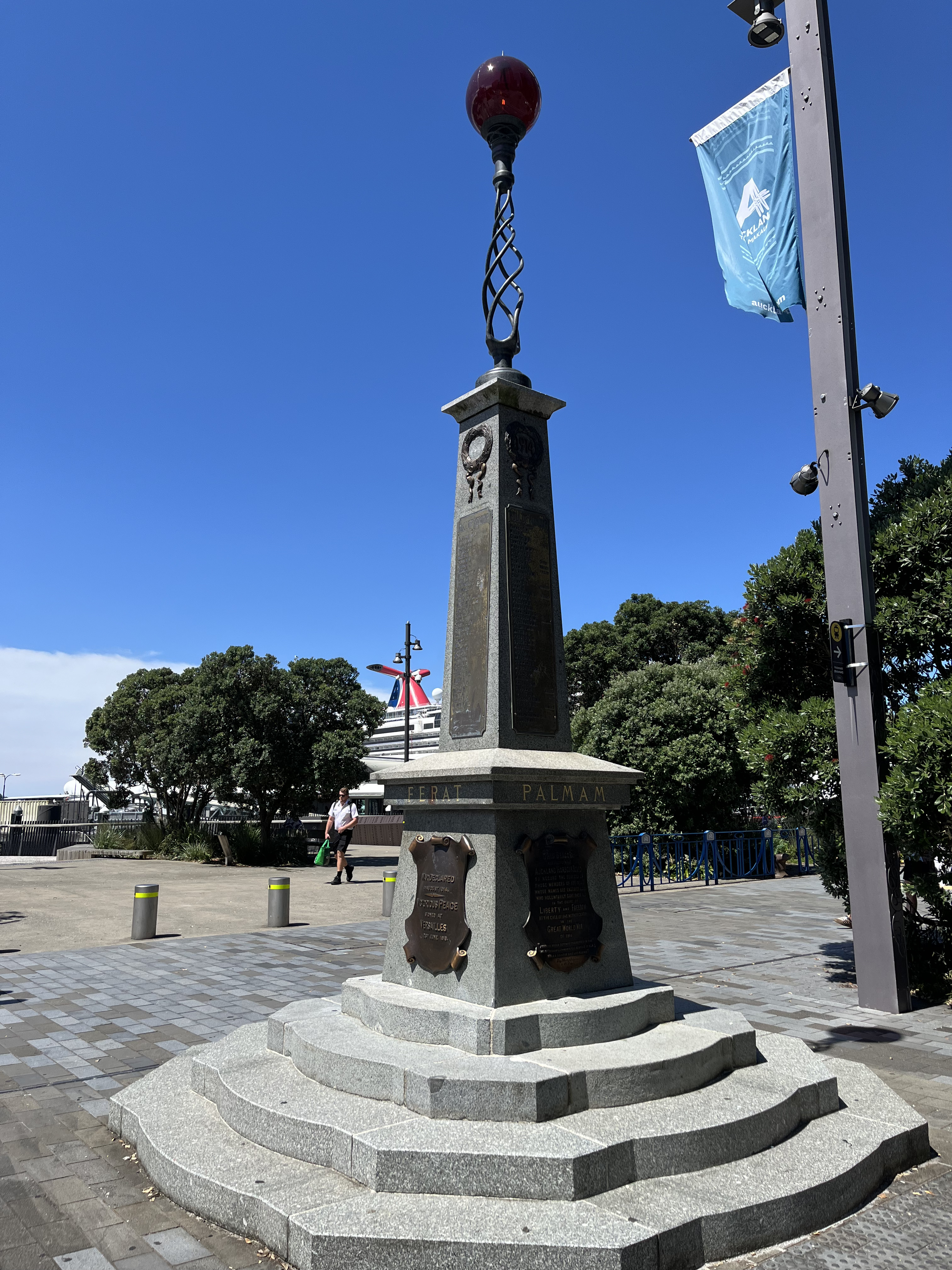
Southwest elevation (2024)

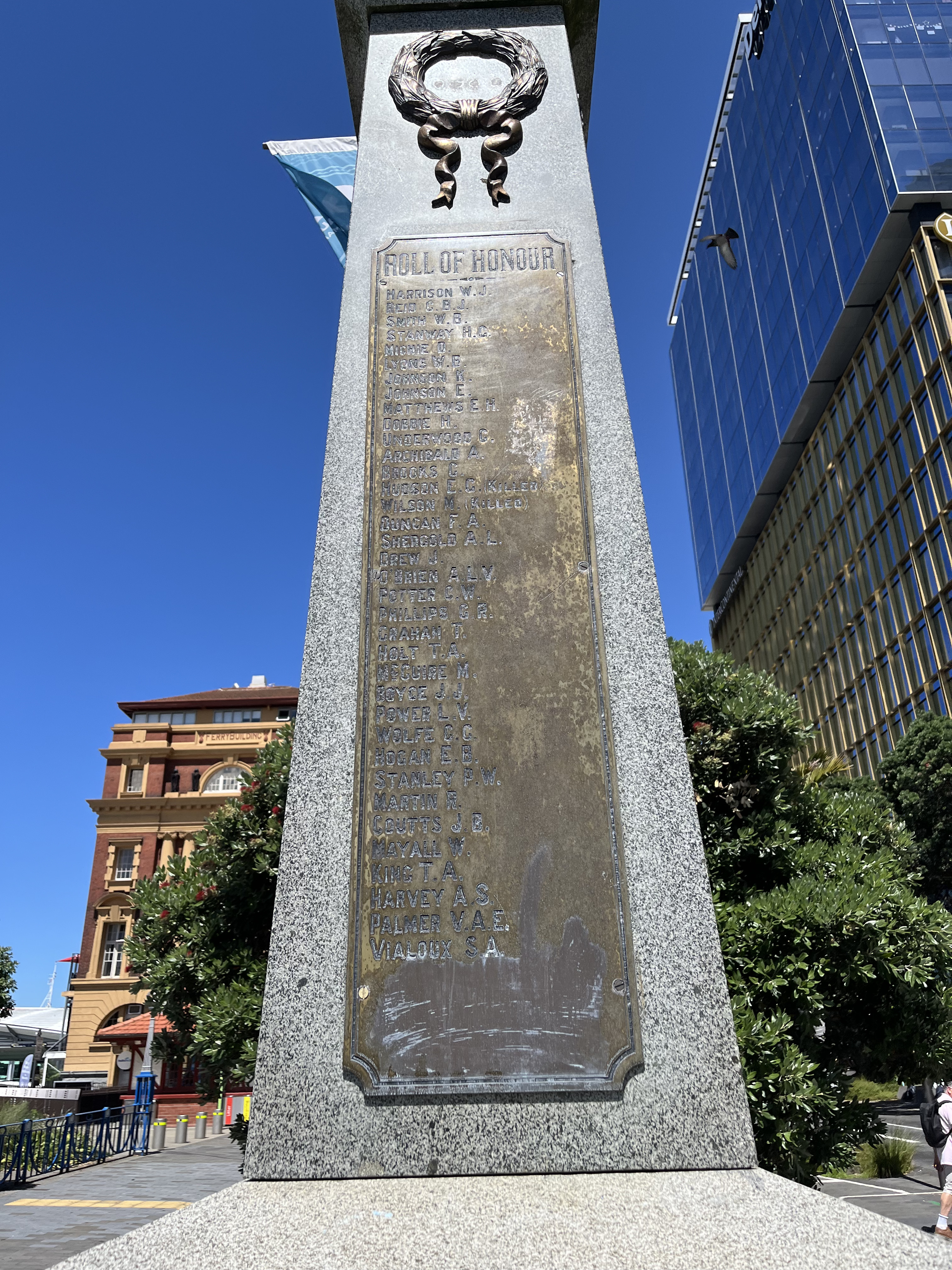
Roll of honour (2024)

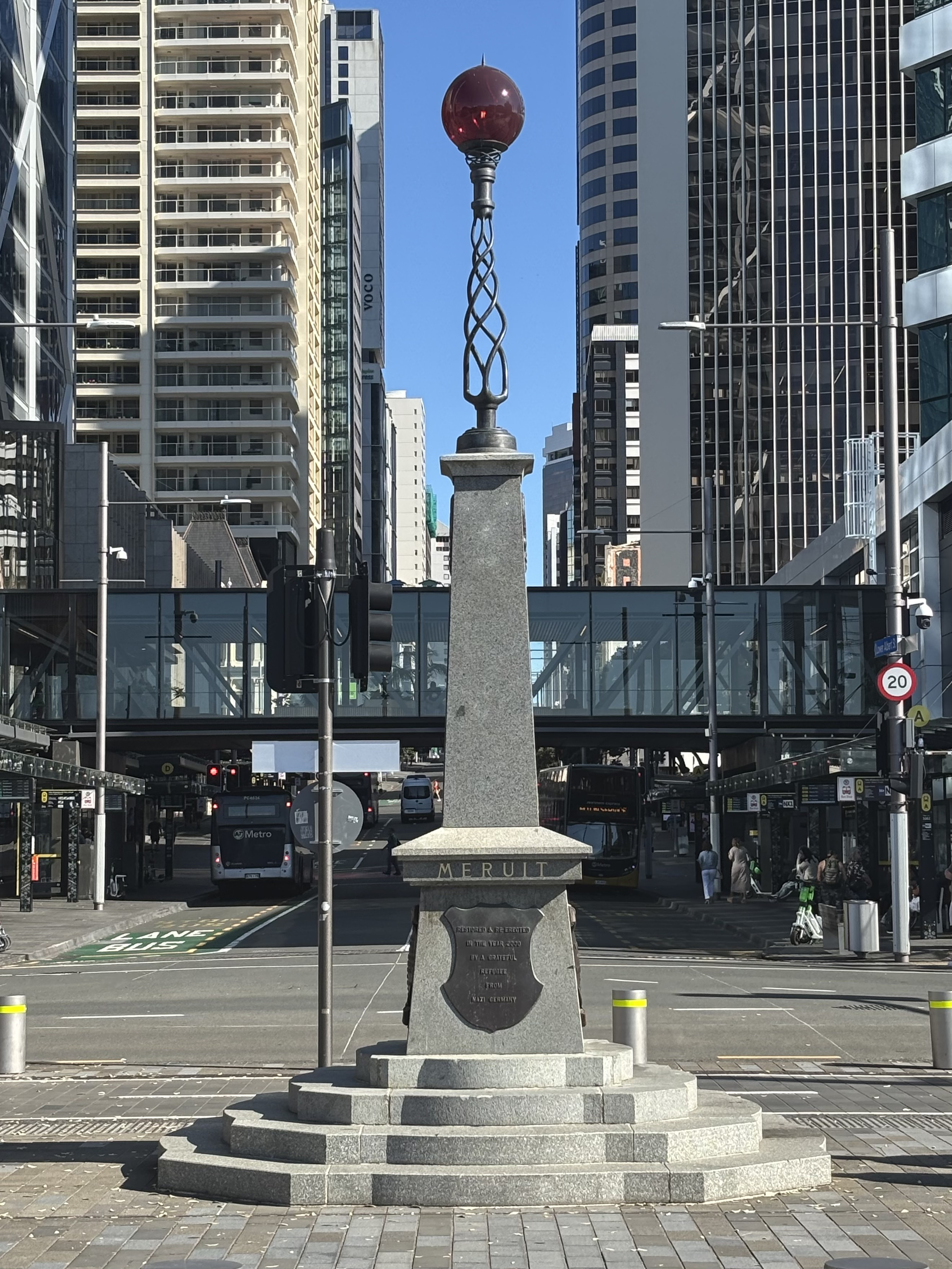
North elevation (2025)

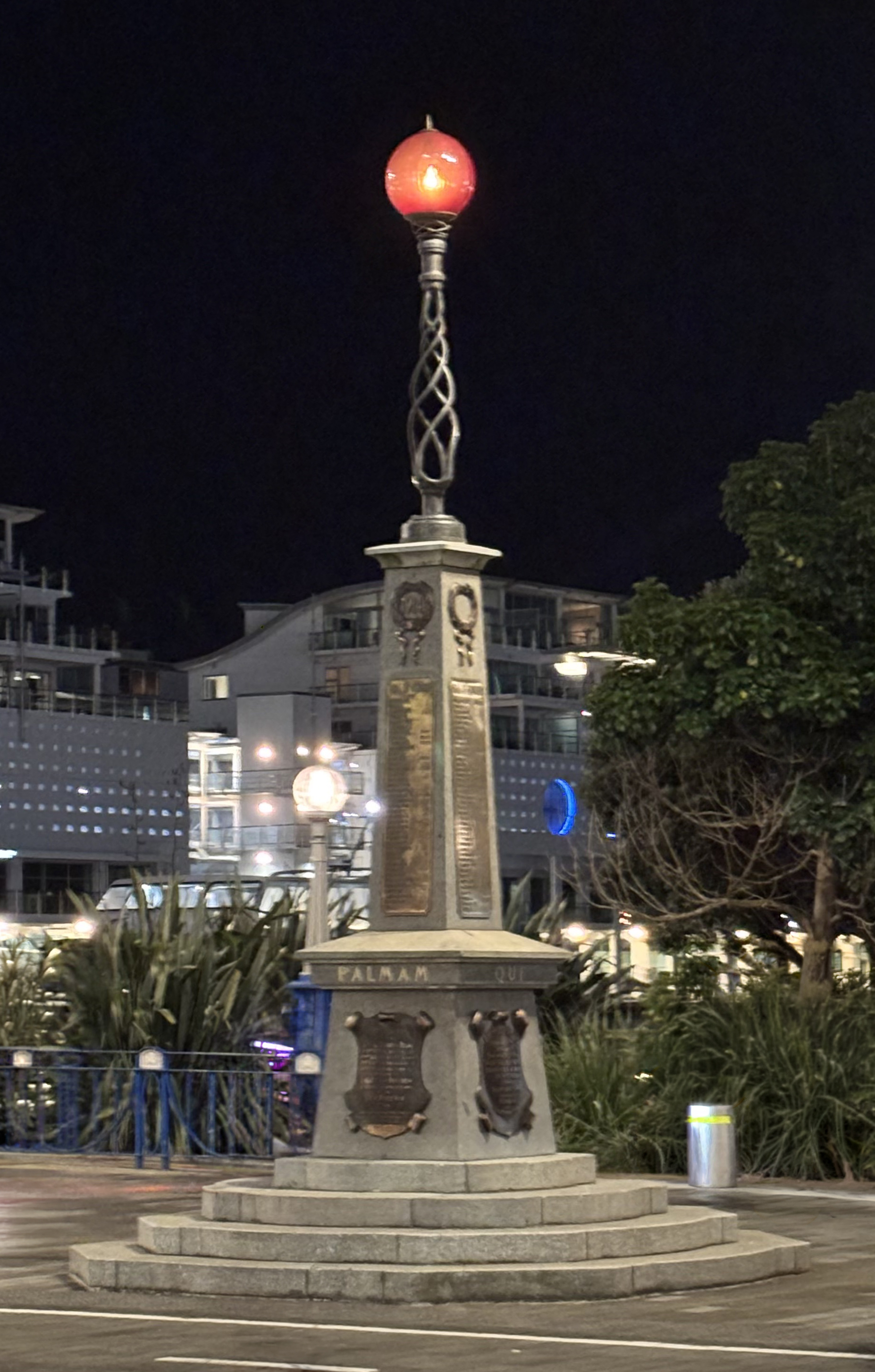
The beacon at night (2026)
