= Te Kāinga Aroha =

Category 1 historic place in Auckland

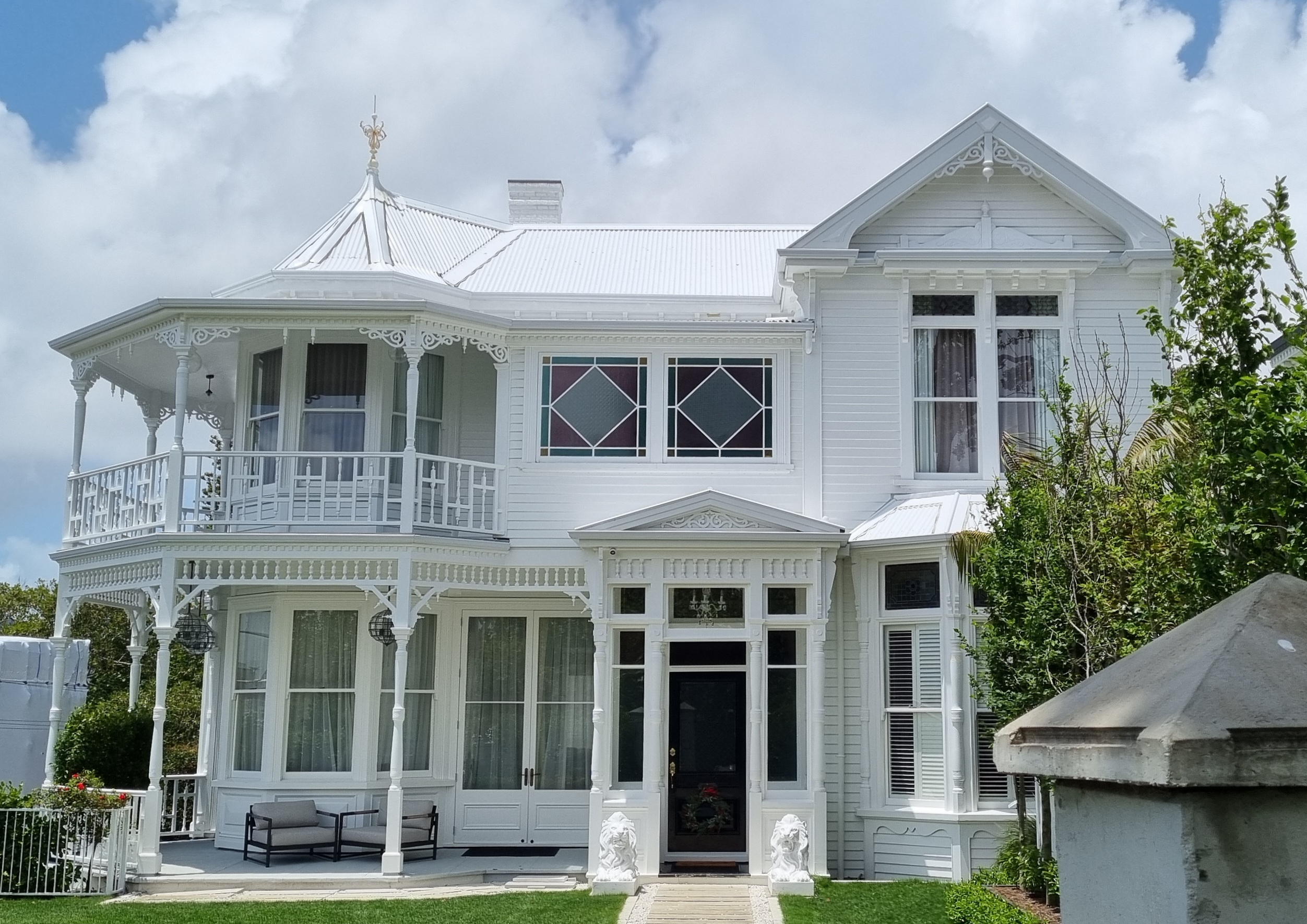
- Te Kāinga Aroha, 2022
- Interactive map of the Te Kāinga Aroha area
- Alternative names: Entrican House, St James's Manse, Hepburn Street Hostel and Heppy

General information
- Architectural style: Italianate architecture
- Location: 29A Hepburn Street, Freemans Bay, Auckland 1011, New Zealand
- Coordinates: 36°51′19.33″S 174°45′2.42″E
- Construction started: 1898

Heritage New Zealand – Category 1
- Designated: 11 November 2022
- Reference no.: 9681

Te Kāinga Aroha is a category 1 historic place in Auckland, New Zealand that has been a private residence, a manse, and a hostel.

== History ==
Te Kāinga Aroha is on the slopes above Freemans Bay. In 1840, the land on which Te Kāinga Aroha was built was transferred from Ngāti Whātua to the Crown. By 1866, a one-storey building was built on the site, later to be replaced by a two-storey building in 1882, on the lower, northern side of the property. This building was briefly occupied by the Little Sisters of the Poor from 1888 to 1898. The land was later subdivided into two sections.

In 1898, the building which would become Te Kāinga Aroha was originally constructed for Andrew Entrican on the higher, southern side of the land. He sold the villa in 1918 to Alex Youngson, a baker. From 1921 to 1943, it acted as the manse for St James' Presbyterian Church, Freemans Bay. In 1943, it was decided that it would become a hostel for young Māori women, run by Sister Jessie Alexander and the United Māori Mission. This was part of a larger movement across New Zealand of creating hostels in urban areas for young Māori.

In April 1944, the hostel, known as Heppy at the time, was opened by the wife of Auckland Mayor John Allum, Annie Allum. It had 29 beds and in its first year saw 130 women go through the hostel. In 1952, boarders were charged between £2/10 to £3 depending on their wages. It continued to operate as a hostel until 2014.

In 2014, the land including the villa was sold once again into private ownership for NZ$3,400,000. The owner subdivided the property and repositioning the former hostel building. It was featured in the 2016 film Hunt for the Wilderpeople.

In 2021, Te Kāinga Aroha, now at 29A Hepburn Street, was sold, reportedly for NZ$7,900,000.

== Description ==
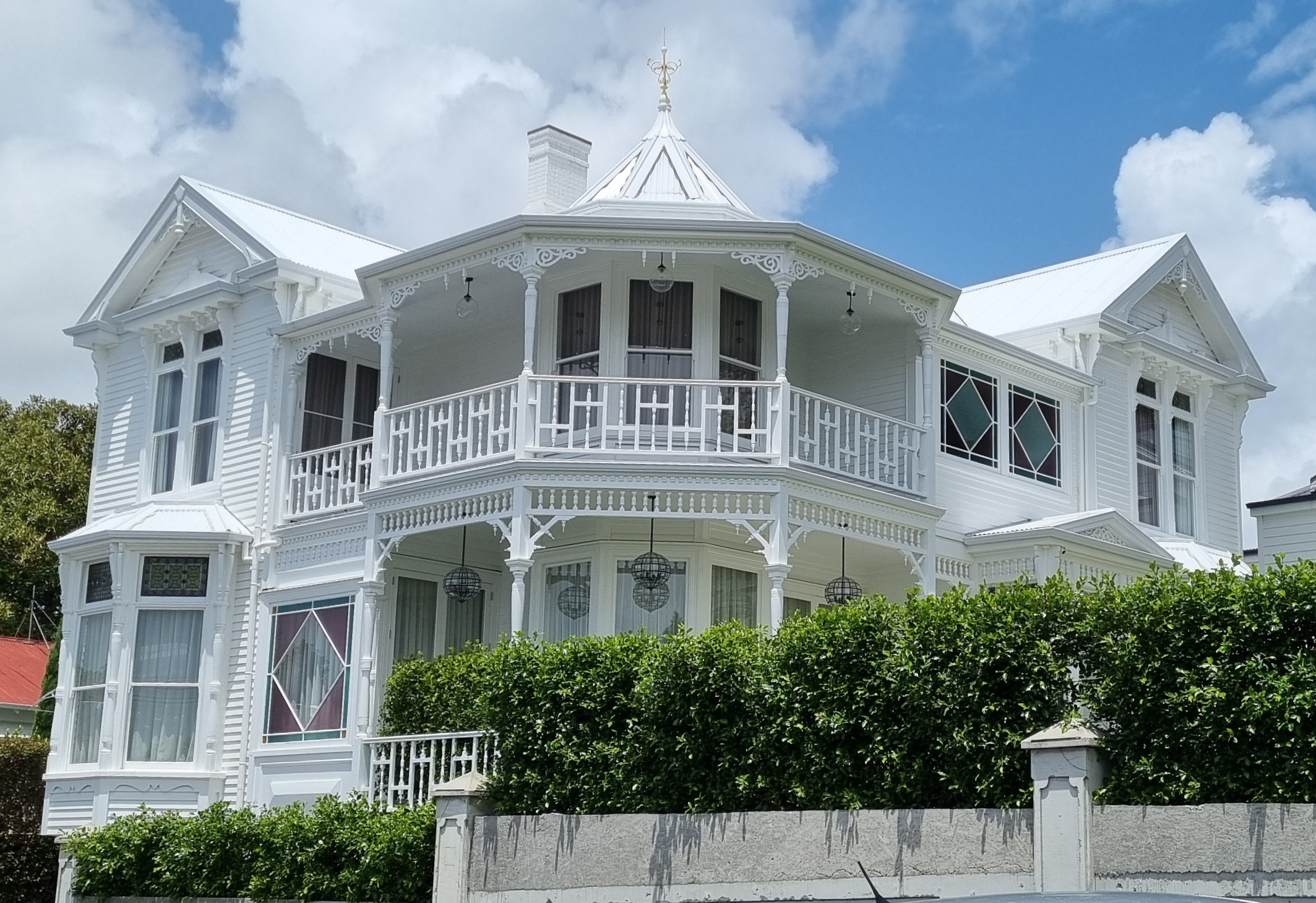
Te Kainga Aroha, showing the corner bay and double return verandah in 2022

The building is a large two-storey timber Italianate corner bay villa, popular with wealthy merchants in Auckland. It had "a largely symmetrical design with a projecting gable wing on each street frontage, joined by a double return verandah." There were decorative elements including a turned columns, fretwork, and a front portico. It also had stained glass used throughout the upper window panes. Internally, there were ten rooms–five upstairs, five downstairs, arranged around central hallways.

There were modifications in 1943-1944 and in 1950 for its use as a hostel, including the expansion of the kitchen. It was then moved on the site to be located towards the front of the property in 2014. Further renovations occurred in 2017, which involved the removal of internal walls, modifications to the bathrooms, and the addition of new windows, swimming pool and a basement garage.
