= Acacia Cottage =

Category 1 historic place in Auckland

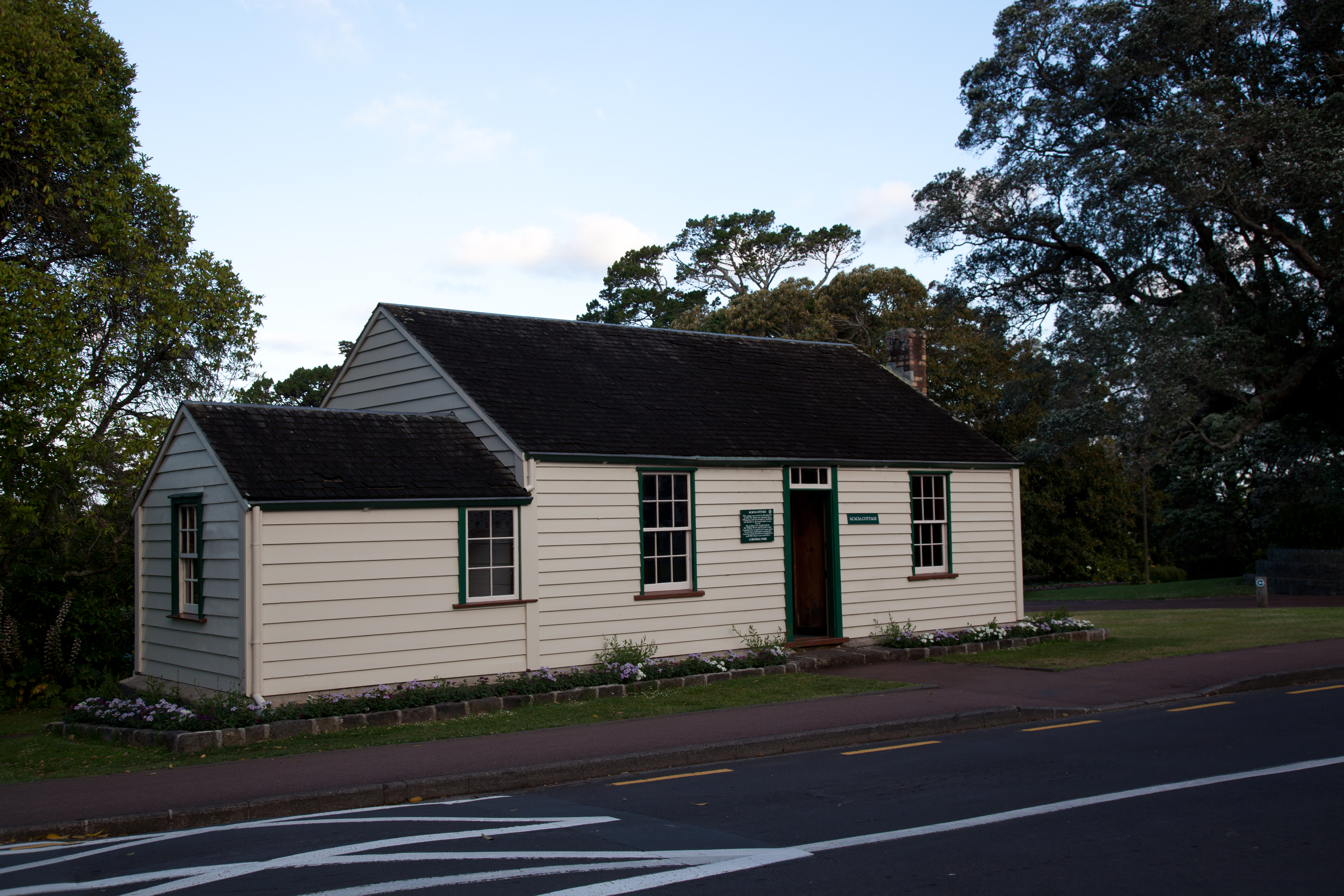

General information
- Architectural style: Georgian Architecture
- Address: Olive Grove Road, Cornwall Park, One Tree Hill, Auckland
- Coordinates: 36°53′51″S 174°47′02″E
- Completed: June 1841
- Owner: John Logan Campbell

Heritage New Zealand – Category 1
- Designated: 2 February 1990
- Reference no.: 525

Acacia Cottage is a category 1 historic place in Auckland and the former residence of John Logan Campbell.

== History ==
Acacia Cottage was built in June 1841 on Shortland Street, in Auckland's CBD, behind John Logan Campbell and William Brown's business. It was originally the residence of Campbell, Brown and Brown's wife, Jessie Brown.

Subsequently, it was inhabited by several families in its location of Shortland Street, who added a fifth room, an outhouse, and verandah. It was moved to its current location in Cornwall Park in October 1920, and the outhouse and part of the verandah were demolished. The cottage was moved by tractor, and images were published in the local newspapers of the transportation. It was moved to a more prominent location within the park, where it now stands, in 1956.

Acacia Cottage is now Auckland's oldest surviving residential building.

== Description ==
Acacia Cottage was built from kauri timbers, roughly sawn, which Campbell bought from Mr. W. Spickman in Whangaroa for £75. It is considered a typical construction and layout for the "initial settlement period."

=== Exterior ===
The exterior is kauri weatherboard, and was reportedly Auckland's first weatherboard constructed building. The roof originally had kauri shingles and wooden guttering. The kauri shingles were replaced with corrugated iron in the 1880s. The foundations were originally wooden, but were replaced with concrete blocks when it was moved firstly in 1921 and subsequently in 1956.

Some changes were made during the period between 1841 and 1921, but it has largely been returned to the original 1841 building structure, except for a wooden addition to the left hand side and the brick chimney which was originally internal.

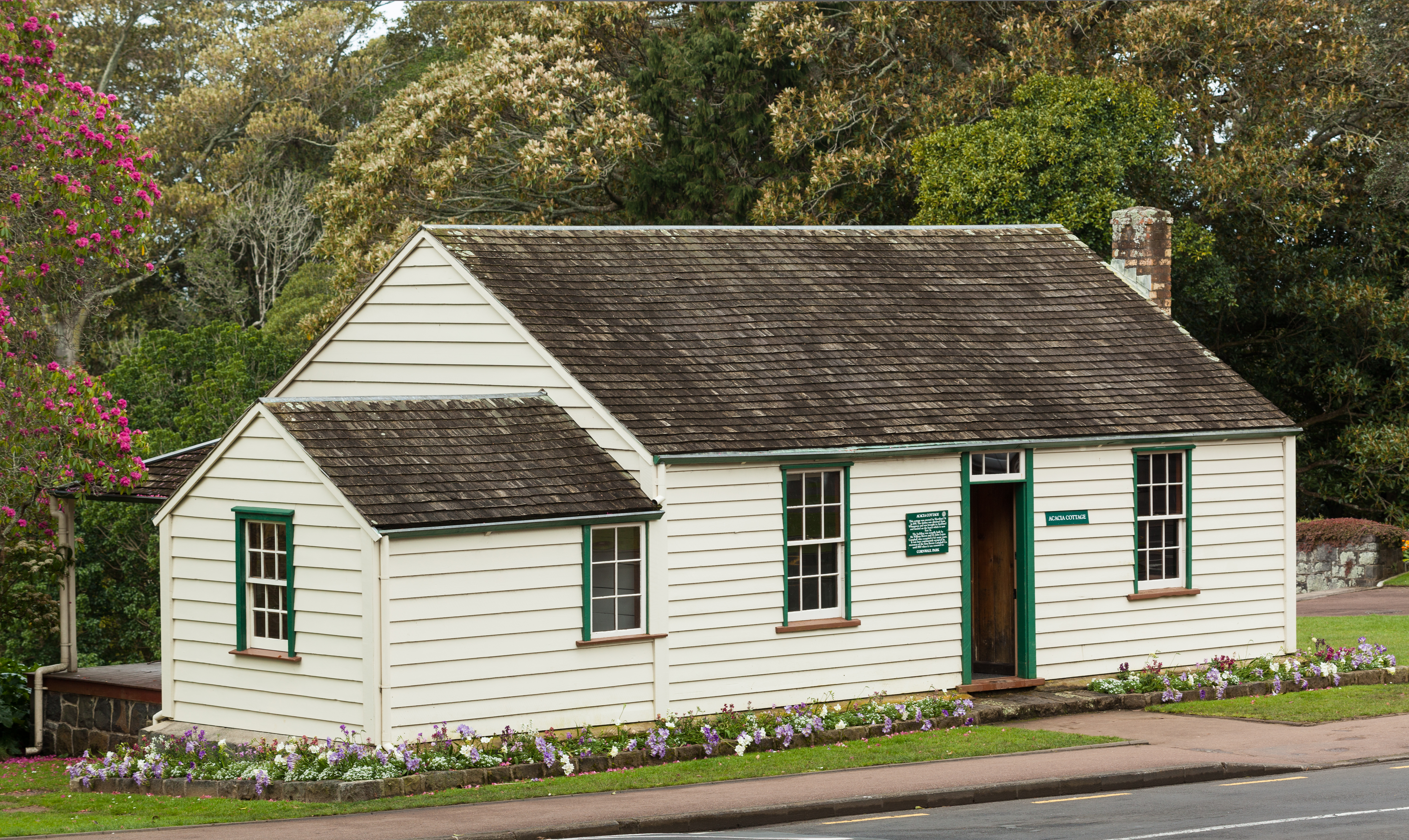
Acacia Cottage, exterior in 2011.

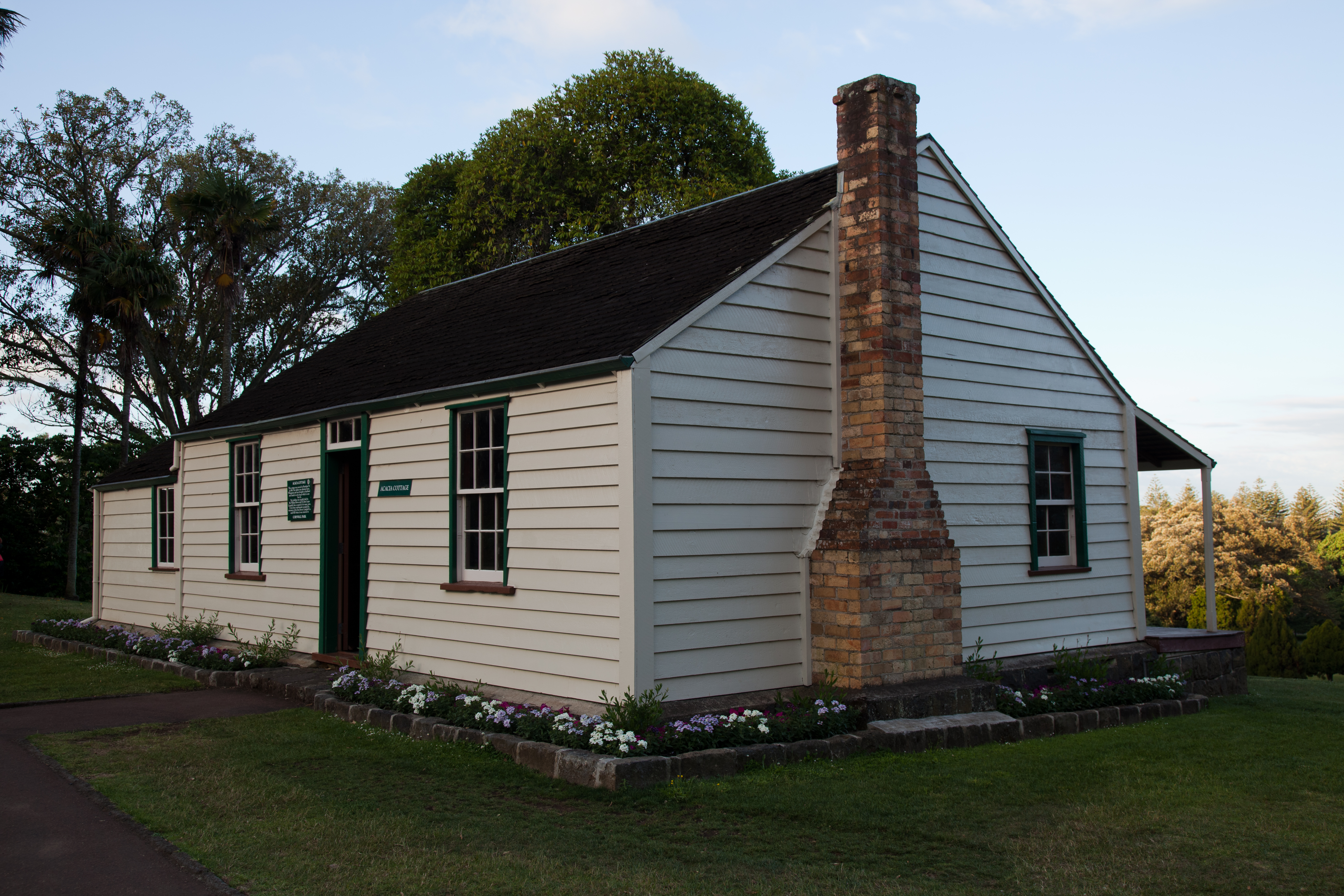
Acacia Cottage, exterior, showing the external brick chimney.

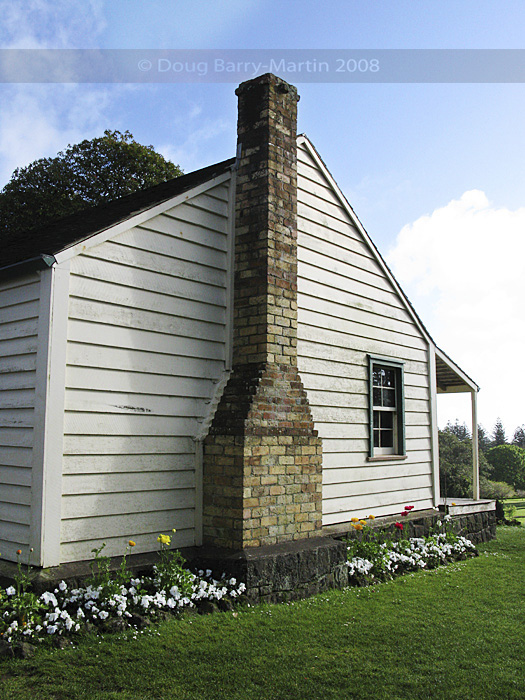
Acacia Cottage, exterior, with brick chimney.

=== Interior ===
It was a simple four-room plan in a Georgian design, with the front door opening onto a central hallway that connects through to the two rear rooms and a back door. An addition fifth room, a bedroom, that was added at a later date, remains on the left hand side.

The interior was lined with kauri. With the addition of the brick chimney on the exterior, the fireplace was replaced with a brick fireplace. The cottage has been staged with 1840-1920s furniture and is open for visitors.

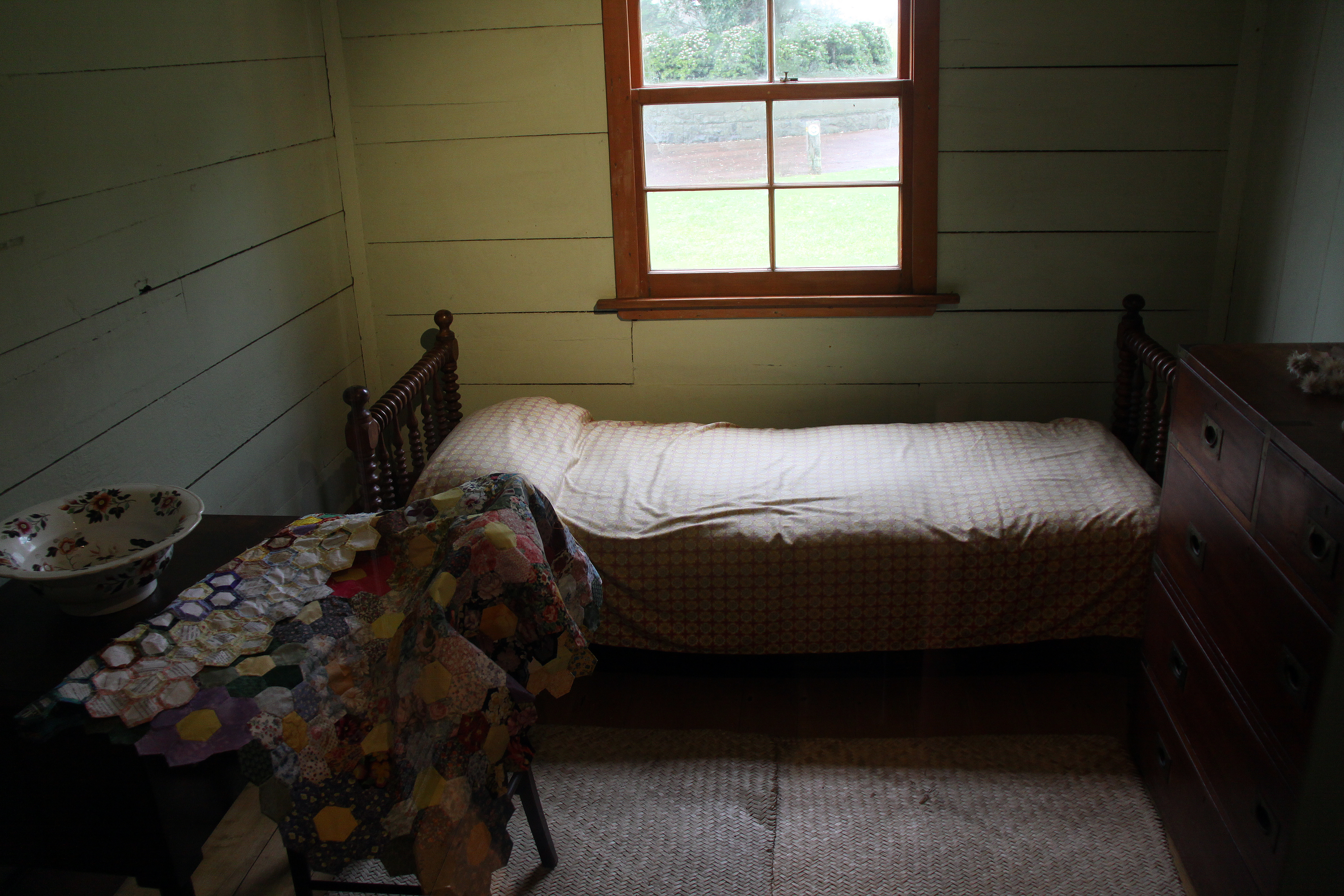
Acacia Cottage, interior, bed.

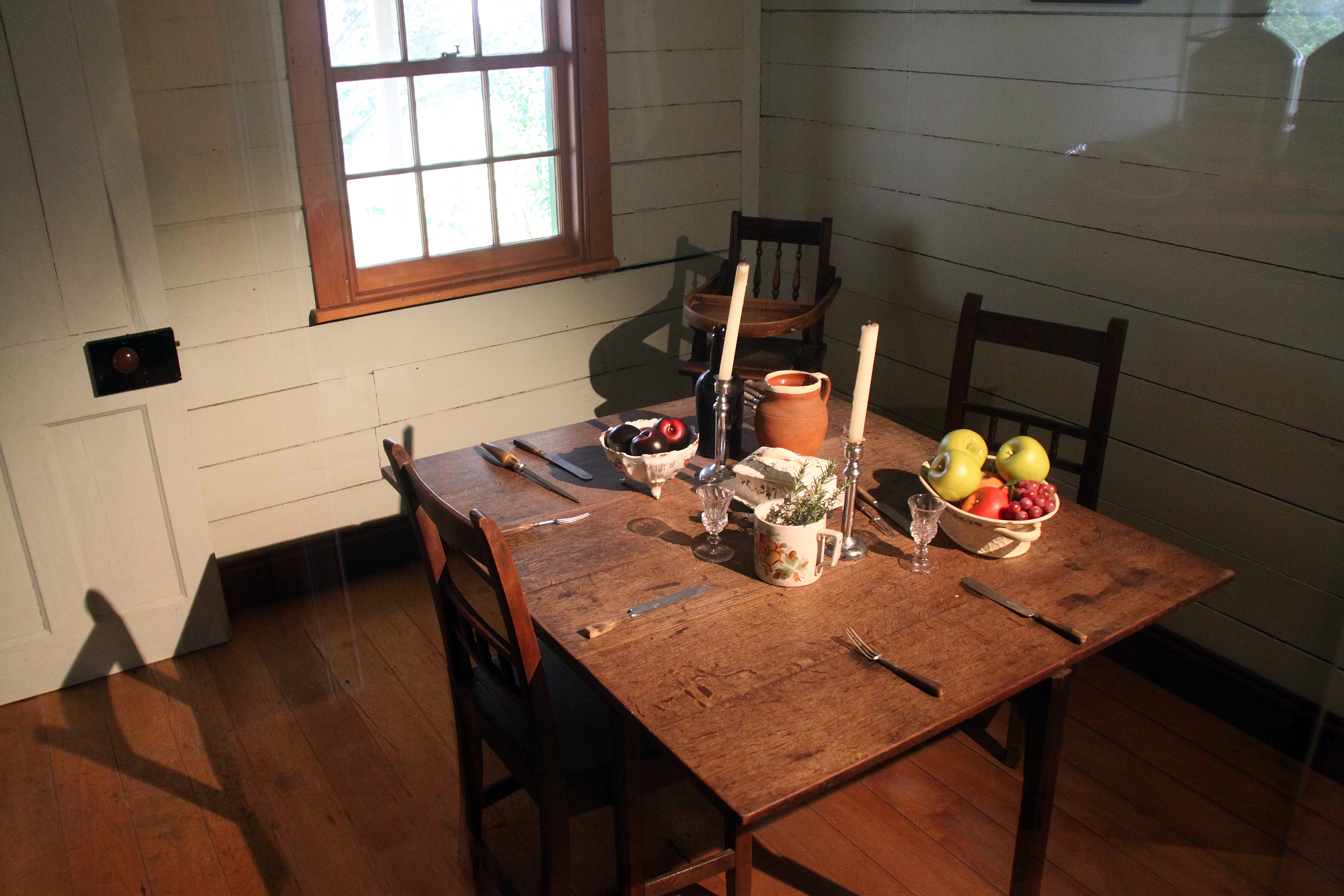
Acacia Cottage, interior, dining table.

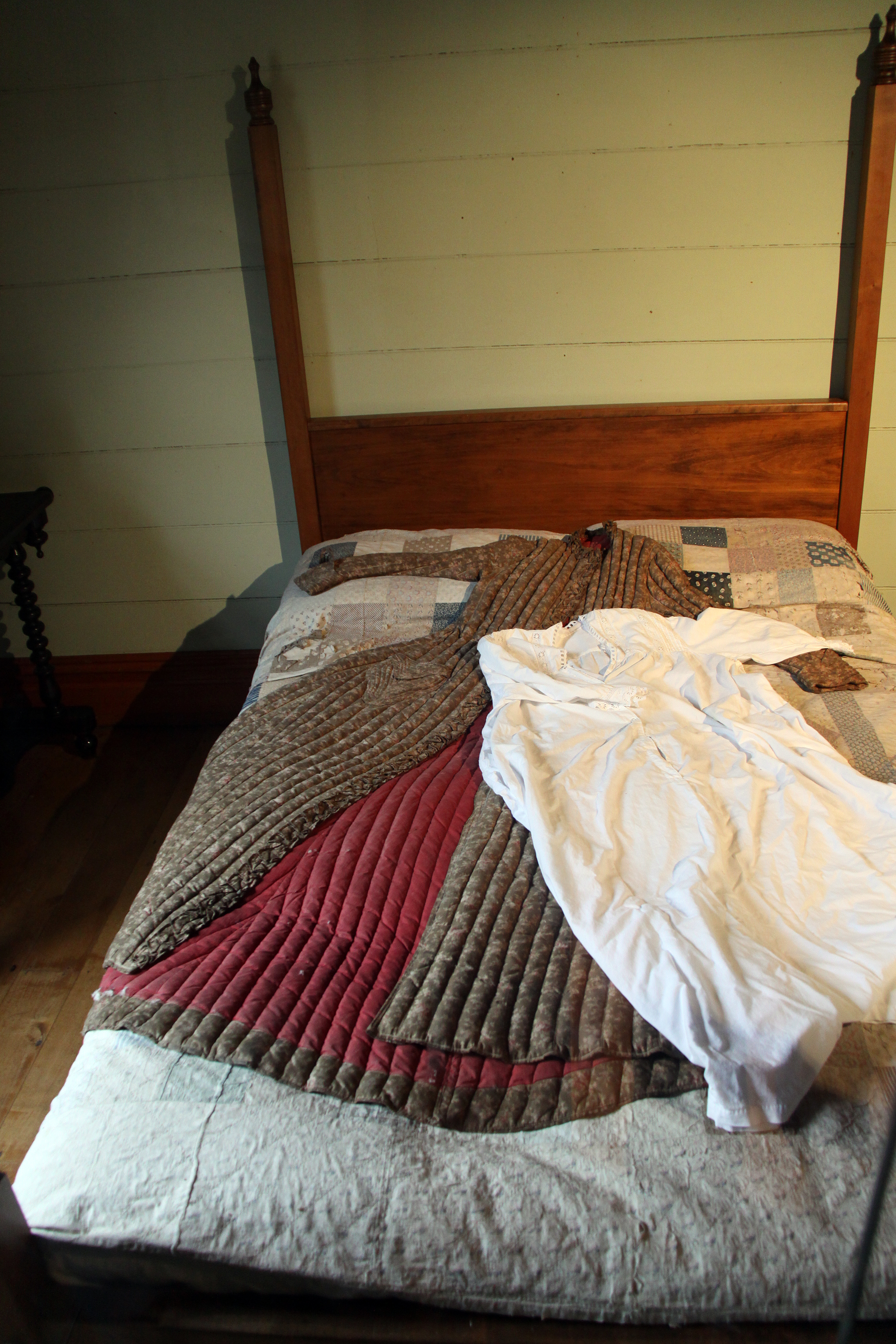
Acacia Cottage, interior, bed.

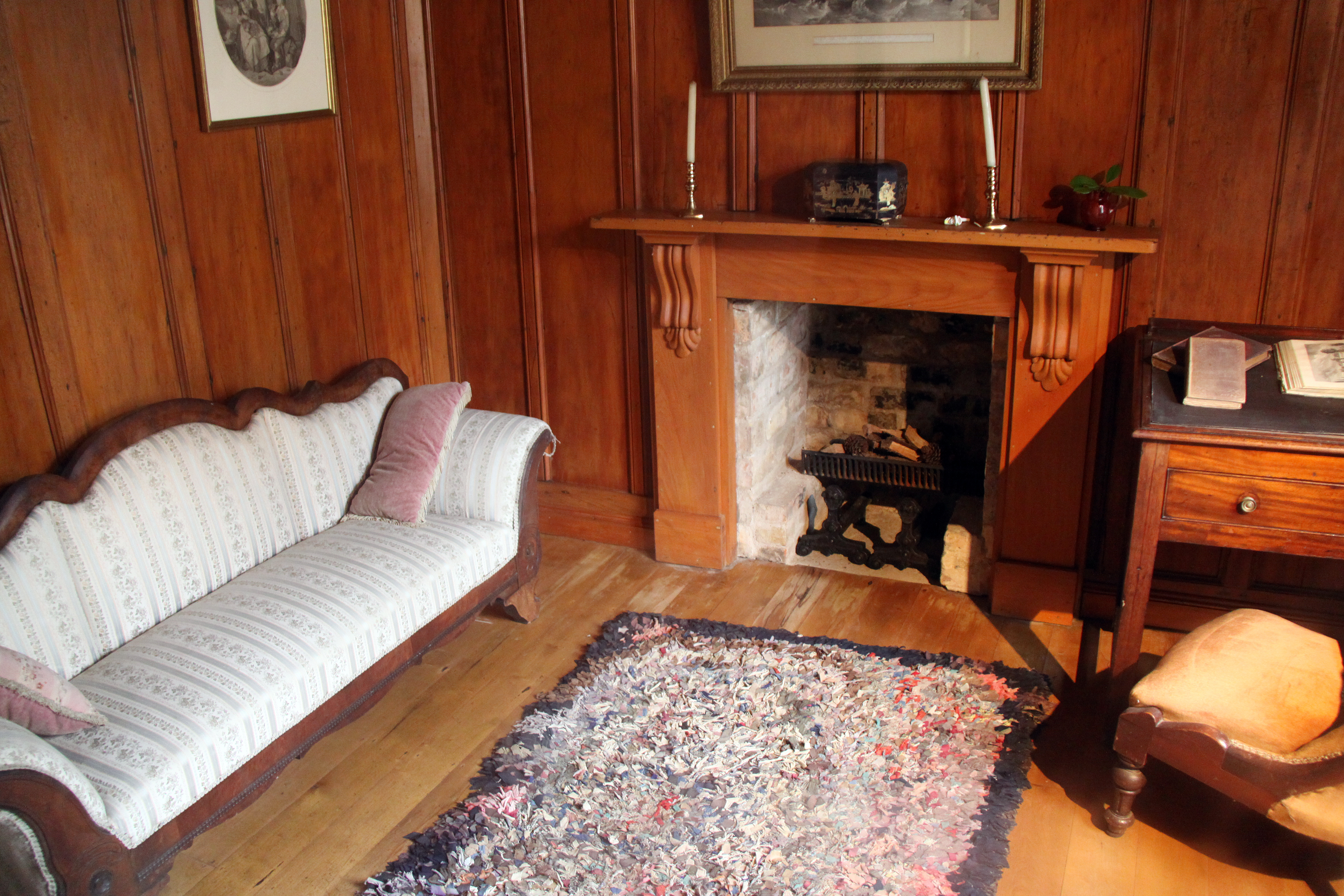
Acacia Cottage, interior, main room with fireplace.
