= Baptist Churches of New Zealand =

Christian denomination

- Te Hāhi Iriiri o Aotearoa
- Classification: Evangelical Christianity
- Theology: Baptist
- Associations: Baptist World Alliance
- Headquarters: Auckland, New Zealand
- Origin: 1882
- Congregations: 240
- Members: 20,627
- Missionary organization: NZBMS
- Seminaries: Carey Baptist College
- Official website: baptist.nz

The Baptist Churches of New Zealand, (Note: Māori: Te Hāhi Iriiri o Aotearoa) formerly the Baptist Union of New Zealand, is a Baptist Christian denomination in New Zealand. It is affiliated with the Baptist World Alliance. Its headquarters are in Auckland.

== History ==
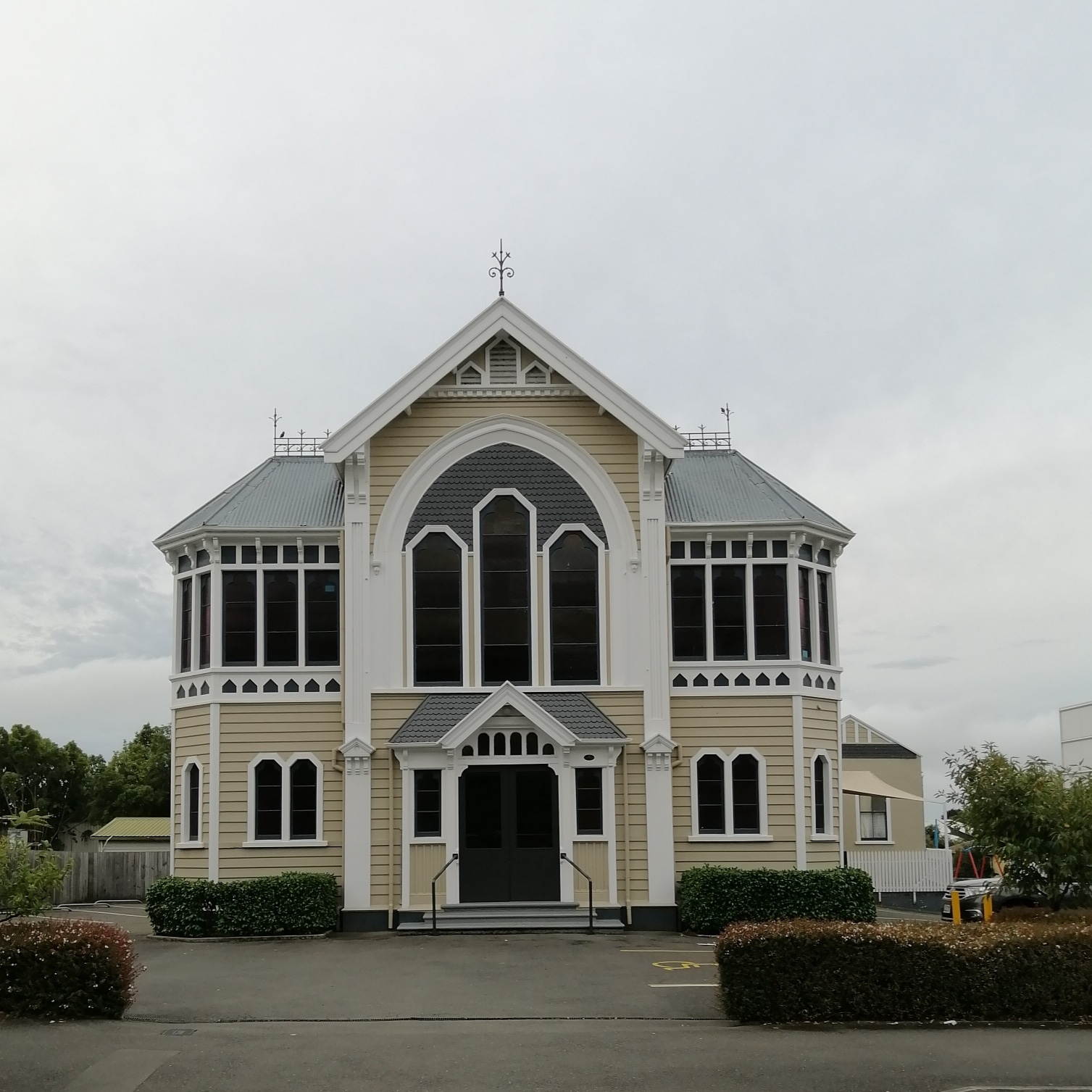
Nelson Baptist Church

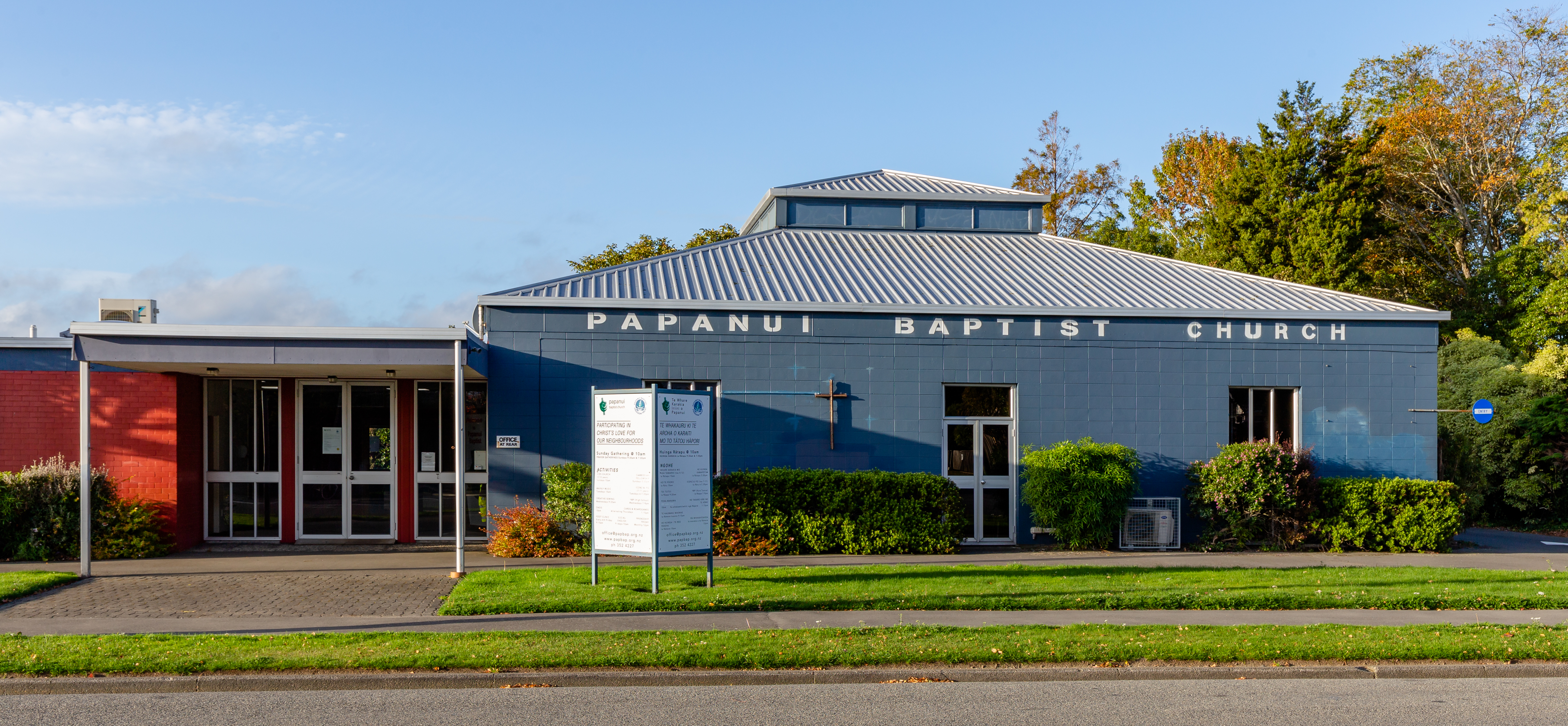
Papanui Baptist Church in Christchurch.

Several Baptists settled in New Zealand in the 1840s, but the first Baptist minister, Decimus Dolamore from Yorkshire, England, did not arrive until May 1851. Dolamore settled in Nelson and was involved in the formation of the first Baptist Church in New Zealand - Nelson Baptist Church - that same year. He was instrumental in obtaining a change in the law to allow Baptist ministers to perform marriage ceremonies; until 1854, only Catholic and Anglican priests were allowed to do so. Dolamore later went to Christchurch and was the first minister for that congregation.

The Canterbury Baptist Association was formed in 1874. This association started the New Zealand Baptist magazine. The Baptist Union of New Zealand was formed at Wellington in October 1882.

The New Zealand Baptist Missionary Society was formed at the 1885 conference of the Baptist Union. At the 1891 conference, the Union established a plan to divide the country into four districts - "Otago/Southland" (org. 1892), "Auckland" (org. 1892), "Canterbury & Westland" (org. 1892), and "Central" (org. 1896). Central District was later divided into the Central District Association and the "Wellington" Association, and "South Auckland" was formed in 1939. South Auckland was later divided into the "Waikato" Association and the "Bay of Plenty" Association (now Bay of Plenty & Eastland). The "Top of the South" Association was formed in 1990. Some groups were called "auxiliary" and some "association", but in 1957, the term "auxiliary" was dropped in favor of the term "association". There are currently 9 associations. By the latter half of the 20th-century Baptists had become the largest non-Conformist group in New Zealand.

According to a census published by the association in 2023, it claimed 240 churches and 20,627 members.

== Beliefs ==
Theologically, the Baptist Churches of NZ member churches are deeply influenced by the charismatic renewal movement, though there is no official position regarding the movement. A study in 1989 indicated that 69% of churches belonging to the Baptist Union identified with the charismatic movement. A smaller portion of member churches are Reformed in doctrine.

The Baptist Churches of NZ has a policy of ordaining female clergy.

== Schools ==
The Union supports education through Carey Baptist College in Penrose, Auckland, and Te Whare Amorangi, designed for Māori men and women, in Papatoetoe, Auckland.

== NZBMS ==
The Baptist Churches of NZ has a missionary organisation called the New Zealand Baptist Missionary Society (NZBMS). It consists of four branches: Tranzsend (sending and ministry), Banzaid (aid and development), Mission World (resourcing and mobilisation) and Marketplacers International (business).

Tranzsend operates in South and Southeast Asia, and the South Pacific.

== Prominent New Zealand Baptists ==
- Decimus Dolamore - first Baptist minister in New Zealand
- Thomas Spurgeon - successful evangelist and son of famous English Baptist preacher, Charles Haddon Spurgeon
- Charles Dallaston - "the Father of the Baptist Union"
- John James North - the first principal of the New Zealand Baptist Theological College
- Hopestill Pillow - Baptist Missionary in the Zenana Missions to India.
- Charles Henry Carter (29 October 1828 – 6 July 1914) - a Baptist missionary to Ceylon. Literary Works - Translations. Carter translated directly from the Greek and Hebrew texts, rather than the English. The Sinhalese work was done in vernacular language, that it could embody the message in a dialect that was understood by the people everywhere. His works include:
  - Sinhalese New Testament 1855
  - Sinhalese Book of Psalms 1863
  - Sinhalese Old Testament 1869
  - English – Sinhalese Dictionary 1881
  - Sinhalese – English Dictionary 1889

Towards the end of his life, Carter became Pastor of the Ponsonby Baptist Church in New Zealand. He was the first president of the Baptist Union of New Zealand. Bishop Coppelstone, Anglican Primate of India is said to have described Carter as the "foremost Sinhalese scholar of this age".
