= Ponsonby Baptist Church =

- 1875 chapel (left) and 1886 church (right)
- Address: 43 Jervois Road and 2 Seymour Street, Ponsonby
- Denomination: Baptist

History
- Founded: March 1875

Architecture
- Architect: Edmund Bell
- Years built: 1875, 1886
- Construction cost: £285 (1875 chapel) £870 (1886 church)

Heritage New Zealand – Category 1
- Designated: 27 June 2013
- Reference no.: 627

Ponsonby Baptist Church is a Baptist church located on the corner of Jervois Road and Seymour Street in Ponsonby, New Zealand. The church site comprises three buildings: an 1875 Gothic Revival chapel, an 1886 Italianate/Neo-classical church, and a 1905 Gothic Revival hall. All buildings are of timber construction.

The Ponsonby congregation grew out of the Baptist church on Wellesley Street with a small chapel erected in 1875. It grew rapidly in the 19th century as both Baptism and Ponsonby expanded, this growth led to the construction of the larger 1886 Italianate/Neo-classical structure designed by Edmund Bell.

The Ponsonby Baptist Church was at the forefront of Baptist unity—being a founding member of the Baptist Union of New Zealand—and in social movements such as the temperance movement. As Ponsonby declined so did the congregation, with both its role and finances declining. The congregation began focusing its efforts on helping the poor and needy, establishing one of the largest community housing trusts in the country in the process.

The Ponsonby Baptist Church is the oldest Baptist congregation to continuously operate from a site and is registered as a category 1 building with Heritage New Zealand.

== Description ==
The 1875 chapel

The church site comprises three buildings: an 1875 chapel and Sunday school, an 1886 church, and a 1905 Sunday school. The site is located on a ridge at the corner of Jervois Road and Seymour Street. Jervois Road is a busy thoroughfare through the suburb of Ponsonby.

The original chapel is a simple wooden Gothic Revival building. It is located on the northern part of the property. The building is similar to the Wellesley Street Baptist Church and the Minniesdale Chapel. Gothic elements include lancet windows. A false ceiling conceals previously visible trusses. In 1955 the chapel was extended for a kitchen and in the 1980s it had French windows and a toilet added. It has two lean-tos on the north and west. In 1985 a lobby was constructed to connect the chapel and church.

The main church building is an 1886 timber structure designed by Edmund Bell that incorporates both Italianate and neoclassical elements. It is located on the southern part of the site facing onto Jervois Road. Ecclesiastical architects typically employed the Gothic Revival style but many non-Conformists eschewed the Gothic style in favour of neo-classical. Bell, a Baptist himself, followed this trend — with his Auckland Baptist Tabernacle being a grand neo-classical structure. The facade is symmetrical and the building is two-storeys in height. The front of the building is well ornamented where as the sides feature little detailing; the sides have five double-hung sash windows with hood mouldings. The front has a pediment and Corinthian pilasters. The porch is as tall as the building itself. The vestibule originally had a single door at the front but this was replaced with a window and flanking doors. The auditorium has a slopping floor to enable all parishioners to view the raised rostrum; non-Conformists believed in the importance of all worshippers being able to both and see and hear the service. Behind the rostrum are two vestries and a room for the pastor. Original interior features include the pews, baptistry, and a roll of honour for both World Wars. The interior is simpler than the front facade with the main detailings being tongue and groove boards, a dado rail, and ceiling roses.

The church features a 1779 organ constructed by John Avery. The organ was shipped from London to St Paul's Church in Britomart before being installed in the Ponsonby church in 1897. The organ was restored and repositioned in 2005. It is one of 10 surviving organs by Avery, the second oldest organ in New Zealand, and the oldest organ in Australasia that has not been seriously altered.

The timber hall was constructed in 1905 in the Gothic style: with a projecting porch, gabled roof, and exposed roof trusses. The building is more simple than the other structures. The more ornate detailing is a stained-glass circular window and lancet window.

== History ==
The Ponsonby congregation grew out of the Wellesley Street church

The church in 1900

The first Baptist chapel in Auckland was built in 1858 on the corner of Wellesley and Chapel Streets. (Note: Now Federal Street) The growth of the Wellesley Street church under Reverend Philip Henry Cornford led to daughter congregations being established including in Mount Eden in 1864. Cornford was an abolitionist who had worked ministered to freed slaves in Jamaica. This congregation spread to Ponsonby, which was said by one 1870s commentator to have: 'many persons in Ponsonby who hold the views of John Foster and Robert Hall', two abolitionist Baptist ministers. The Ponsonby congregation took a strong stance on social issues, particularly gaming, temperance, sexual deviancy, and religious indifference.

In December 1874 a lot on the corner of Jervois Road and Seymour Street in the Dedwood subdivision was purchased by six Baptist men (Note: George William Owen (merchant), John William James (builder), Charles Gaze (saddler), John Bigelow (shipbuilder), Samuel Carey Brown (accountant) and John Edmiston (bondkeeper)) for a chapel and Sunday School. Tenders went out in January 1875 and the Sunday School opened in March with the chapel hosting its first service a week after; Cornford held the first service alongside Reverend Alexander Reid. In addition to its religious purpose the chapel was also used for secular meetings, including for meetings of the Ponsonby Highway District. The chapel cost £285 to construct — the architect and builder are unknown but it may have been church trustee John William James, a builder who worked on St Stephen's Church, Ponsonby and the Church of the Holy Sepulchre, Grafton.

Services at the Ponsonby chapel were originally held by lay preachers until 1880 when the Ponsonby congregation formally separated from the Wellesley Street Church and acquired Richard Jones as pastor. Jones only lasted a year before being replaced by Charles Carter who would serve until 1885. The Ponsonby congregation was a founding member of the Baptist Union of New Zealand with Carter serving as the inaugural president. The population of Ponsonby had more than doubled between the 1874 and 1881 census and this trend continued at the 1886 census. The population boom in Ponsonby led to increased demand for Baptist services resulting in an extension of the chapel in 1882 and three years later the congregation were renting out the Ponsonby Hall to hold services. The population increase led to a decision to construct a new church; in February 1885 the adjoining lot was acquired to allow for construction of a larger building. The chapel was relocated to the northern (rear) end of the site to make room for the new church whilst it continued to serve as a Sunday school.

On 19 January 1886 the foundation stone was laid by Doctor Thomas Brutton Kenderdine. Kenderdine was the president of the Auckland Medical Association and had laid the foundation stone of the Auckland Baptist Tabernacle. Edmund Bell, prominent Baptist architect who had also designed the Auckland Tabernacle, designed a timber structure that incorporated both Italianate and neoclassical elements. The contract was awarded to W. Hutchison and Sons and cost £870. Thomas Spurgeon, son of influential Baptist Charles Spurgeon, conducted the opening service on 16 May 1886. In June 1886 former Premier Sir William Fox spoke at a temperance meeting in the church. The congregation was involved in the temperance movement setting up a local branch of the Band of Hope Society and allowing the prohibition committee to meet in the old chapel. In 1887 Reverend John D. Gilmore became the pastor. Under Gilmore the church founded the first New Zealand Christian Endeavour branch, a year later the group was one of five Baptist churches that founded the Auckland Association of the Baptist Union with Gilmore serving as inaugural president. Gilmore was succeeded by Reverend Archibald Henry Collins. Collins was a supporter of trade unions and chairman of the Auckland Conciliation Board for 4 years. Collins was an Evangelical who served as secretary of the Baptist Union from 1894–1900 when he became president until 1901.

The Gospel requires us to carry the law of Christ into our civil, our social, and our political relationship. 'Behave as citizens.' [Philippians 1.27]... There are men who make it their boast that they never register their vote, never sit on School Board or City Council, never champion any great public cause, never appear on a public platform.... And these men, who reckon themselves very eminent saints, instead of blushing for their laziness, lay the flattering unction to their souls, that it was of such as they are that the Lord Christ thought when He offered His intercessory prayer. But when our Lord prayed that His followers may be kept from the evil of the world, He intended that they should be in the world, in the thick of the fight, but be preserved from the world's spirit, the world's lust, the world's sin. His prayer was that they should learn to walk white in black places.... Dr. Dale... said this in days when men had not learned to talk so freely about 'the Civic Church;' he expounded from his pulpit the duty and responsibility of citizenship....

— Archibald Henry Collins, sermon at the Ponsonby Baptist Church

The original entrance-way was replaced with a window and two flanking doors.

Reverend Alfred North succeeded Collins in 1903, who would serve for 8 years. North served on the executive council of the Baptist Union for almost 40 years, helped form the New Zealand Baptist Missionary Society, founded the New Zealand Baptist, and implemented many improvements such as a annuity for retired ministers. The church underwent serious renovation work in 1902–1903 with the interior redesigned. Part of these renovations may have involved changing the pulpit arch to a Gothic style one. The dawn of the 20th century was a period of growth Auckland Baptists with two new congregations at Grange Road and Epsom. In 1905 a Gothic timber hall was constructed at the rear of the site for the Sunday School and meetings, the architect is unknown but was likely Alexander Wiseman who played the organ at the opening and had worked on the Baptist Tabernacle. The church hall bears similarities to the Buckland Methodist Church designed by Wiseman.

Despite strong growth at the dawn of the 20th century the fortunes of the church began to decline, with many young men dying in the First World War, migration away from Ponsonby to other suburbs, and the economic depression resulting in an inability to pay the pastor's salary. The church took on student pastors from the Baptist Theological College for a while. The church began to turn around under Reverend Jack Wakelin, an evangelist. Under Wakelin the congregation grew with troubled young girls from Salem House and the United Maori Mission regularly attending. In 1988 Reverend Mike Riddell founded the Community of Refuge Trust, which provided accommodation for low-income families in Ponsonby. The trust uses the chapel as its administrative centre. Riddell wrote a book based on the church and a parishioner titled The Insatiable Moon, which was later developed into a film.

Still active today the congregation is the oldest Baptist congregation to have continuously operated from the same site in Auckland. The church is registered as a category 1 building with Heritage New Zealand.

== See also ==
- Hanover Street Baptist Church – Heritage-listed Baptist church in Dunedin
