= Mike Riddell =

New Zealand writer (1953–2022)

- Born: 23 March 1953; Porirua, New Zealand
- Died: 26 March 2022 (aged 69); Ida Valley, New Zealand
- Occupations: Minister, writer
- Spouse: Rosemary Riddell
- Children: 3
- Writing career
- Genre: Urban Fantasy
- Subject: Christian theology
- Movement: Emerging church
- Website: www.mikeriddell.co.nz

Michael Riddell (23 March 1953 – 26 March 2022) was a New Zealand Christian minister and writer.

== Early life ==
Riddell was born in Porirua East (now Cannons Creek), New Zealand, and began schooling at Porirua East Primary School. He was the youngest of a family of four, with two sisters and a brother. His family moved to Christchurch, where he continued schooling at Northcote Primary School, while living near the Styx River. Secondary schooling took place at Christchurch Boys' High School, complete with Army Cadets and regular rugby. In the sixth form, he switched from sciences to arts.

He flew to Australia, hitchhiking up the east coast from Adelaide to Cairns, and spending some time living in a hippie commune in the rainforest north of Cairns. A return to New Zealand saw him hold down a succession of jobs long enough to earn a fare to the United Kingdom. He hitchhiked around Europe and Northern Africa. He returned to London, where he met Rosemary, a New Zealander who became his lifetime partner, and travelled back to New Zealand via Asia.

Riddell was accepted for the New Zealand Baptist Theological College in Auckland, so the family moved there in 1979. During the time at College, Riddell was involved in protest against the 1981 South Africa rugby union tour of New Zealand. The family moved to Switzerland in 1982, where Riddell pursued postgraduate studies in Theology at an international seminary near Zurich, graduating summa cum laude at the end of 1984.

== Religious career ==
Riddell returned to New Zealand, and was ordained and appointed minister of Ponsonby Baptist Church, a small congregation in the central city. Here he was to remain for some nine years. He held a variety of jobs concurrent with that of minister, as a journalist for New Outlook, a current affairs journal, and later as a part-time lecturer at Baptist College. His first book, Godzone: A Guide to the Travels of the Soul, was published in 1992.

While minister of Ponsonby Baptist, Riddell was instrumental in establishing the Community of Refuge Trust, a community housing initiative providing accommodation for psychiatric patients and low-income tenants. He was actively involved in local affairs and served for a time on the Ponsonby Community Committee. In 1991, Riddell was involved in a confrontation with Auckland City Council over the proposed sale of Council housing in the Freemans Bay Area. He informed the councillors that they were stripping their city's poor of their dignity and leaving them naked.

Riddell resigned from being minister at Ponsonby Baptist in 1993. He became a lecturer in theological education, teaching under the University of Auckland School of Theology bachelor's degree.

In 1988 Riddell founded the Community of Refuge Trust, which provided accommodation for low-income families in Ponsonby.

== Writing career ==
In 1997, Flamingo published his first novel, The Insatiable Moon. Riddell moved to Dunedin, where he become a Catholic layman, and wrote full-time. He produced another ten books, the play Jerusalem, Jerusalem, and a screenplay of The Insatiable Moon, a feature film released in 2011. The film is based on a parishioner Riddell met during his pastorate at the Ponsonby Baptist Church.

In 2003 he completed his PhD through the University of Otago, on James K. Baxter's contribution to New Zealand spirituality.

== Publications ==
=== Fiction ===
- The Insatiable Moon (1997)
- Deep Stuff (1999)
- Masks & Shadows (2000)

=== Non-fiction ===
- Godzone: A Guide to the Travels of the Soul (1992)
- Alt.Spirit@Metro.M3: Alternative Spirituality for the Third Millennium (1997)
- God's Home Page - A Journey Through the Bible for Postmodern Pilgrims (1998)
- Threshold of the Future - Reforming the Church in the Post-Christian West (1998)
- Sacred Journey - Spiritual Wisdom for Times of Transition (2000)
- The Prodigal Project with Mark Pierson and Cathy Kirkpatrick, SPCK (2000)
