= Luke Hurley =

New Zealand musician

Luke Hurley (born 31 August 1957) is an independent New Zealand guitarist and singer-songwriter, who works mostly outside the confines of the music industry. He was born in Kenya, and moved with his family to Gore in Southland, New Zealand when aged 12. He achieved a degree of early success on student radio with the song "Mona Lisa" in the early 1980s at University of Otago in Dunedin.

Growing up in Kenya and Zanzibar exposed Luke to Arabic, African and Indian styles of music which have influenced him to this day. Mississippi John Hurt was also an influence. Luke's current style of playing has also been described as "Indian tabla meets Irish rock". Another comparison with singer-songwriters might be with Bruce Cockburn and Ron Sexsmith who are also prolific but outside the commercial mainstream.

He is now based in Auckland, and has toured with artists such as Michelle Shocked and Marianne Faithfull but is more likely to be found at fringe festivals or even busking. He has self recorded the equivalent of about 8 albums since the early 1980s. The most recent, High Risk, features 17 songs recorded at some of Auckland's best sound studios. It was engineered by Steve Garden and mastered by Chris Chetland at Kog Studio. The album was reviewed by Liz Barry who said it "...captivates the listener with gentle melodies, exquisite guitar technique and simple yet sometimes complex rhythms."

High Risk was released in 2000 and is perhaps the most well recorded example of Luke's capabilities. High Risk was strongly supported by Dr Greg Finucane (Neuropsychiatrist) who is credited as Executive Producer and who was also a member of two bands 'The Clear' and 'Thin Red Line' previously. High Risk took 4 years to record and complete. As relayed in an interview with Andrew Dubber, Luke described the album as part of his recovery process from depression. The album is named High Risk because for many of the people who supported the project it was a high risk as to whether it would succeed.

His own website features samples of his music and much more background information. In January 2007 he was signed by Monkey Records who have produced and recently released a compilation album, Luke Hurley, The Best Of, 1981–2006. He was a featured artist at the Auckland Arts Festival. Luke performs often at festivals and was described as "one of New Zealand's great unknown musicians" by organisers at the Wellington Busking Festival.

In 2008 Luke completed a double album called Brother Sun Sister Moon with Brother Sun being the full album and Sister Moon an instrumental only version highlighting Luke's guitar technique and style. Since July 2008 Luke has been on an extended tour of UK and nearby cities. He was based in Dublin, Ireland for most of this time with concerts and other performances in London, Paris and Stockholm through to early January 2009.

In 2010 Luke appears in the opening of the New Zealand movie The Insatiable Moon playing his own song. As well he wrote many riffs for the project and recommended his Dunedin friend Neville Copland to be composer.

Luke currently performs publicly, on the corner of Queen and Victoria Streets, mid-town Auckland, NZ, and has done for several years.

== Discography ==
- Policestate (1983)
- Japanese Overdrive (1984)
- Make Room (1986) Compilation
- Luke Live (1987)
- Revival EP (1987)
- First Civilian (1989)
- Alone in Her Field (1990)
- Stop Luke Listen (1990) Compilation
- Reha (1994)
- High Risk (2000)
- The Best Of (1981–2006) (2007) Compilation
- Brother Sun Sister Moon (2008) Double album
- The Insatiable Moon Soundtrack (2010)
- Una Mañana de Sabado (2015)Live
- Happy Isles (2019)
