= Quay Street, Auckland =

Street in Auckland, New Zealand

Coordinates: 36.844°S 174.771°E

Quay Street
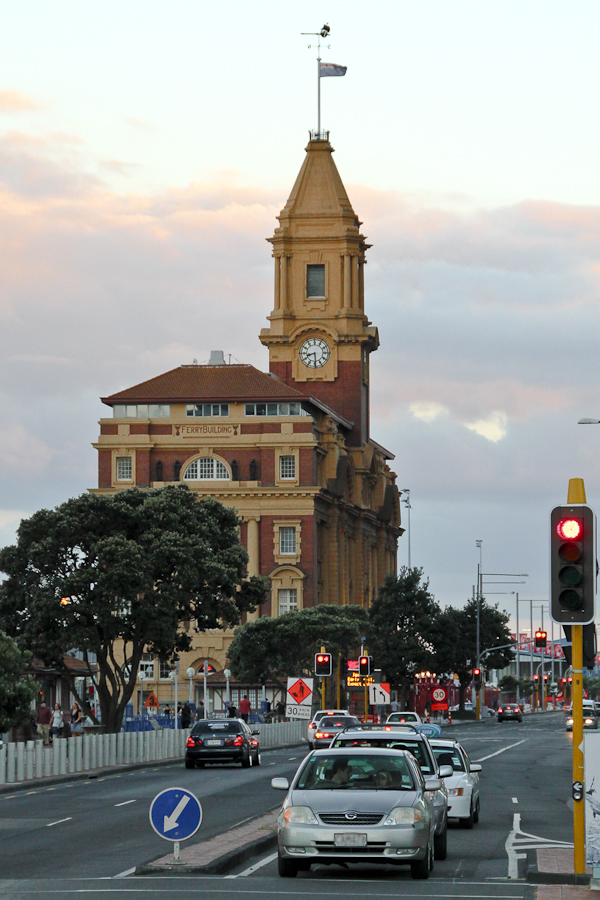
- Quay Street looking east, 2011
- Length: 1.8 km (1.1 mi)
- Location: Auckland CBD, New Zealand
- Postal code: 1010
- West end: Hobson Street, Viaduct Harbour
- East end: Tāmaki Drive, The Strand

Quay Street is the northernmost street in the Auckland CBD, New Zealand. The Auckland Ferry Terminal, which has ferries running to Devonport, Waiheke Island, and other places in Waitematā Harbour; the Hilton Auckland hotel; and Ports of Auckland are on the north side of the street. Waitematā railway station, Te Komititanga and Grand Mercure Auckland hotel are on the south side.

== History ==
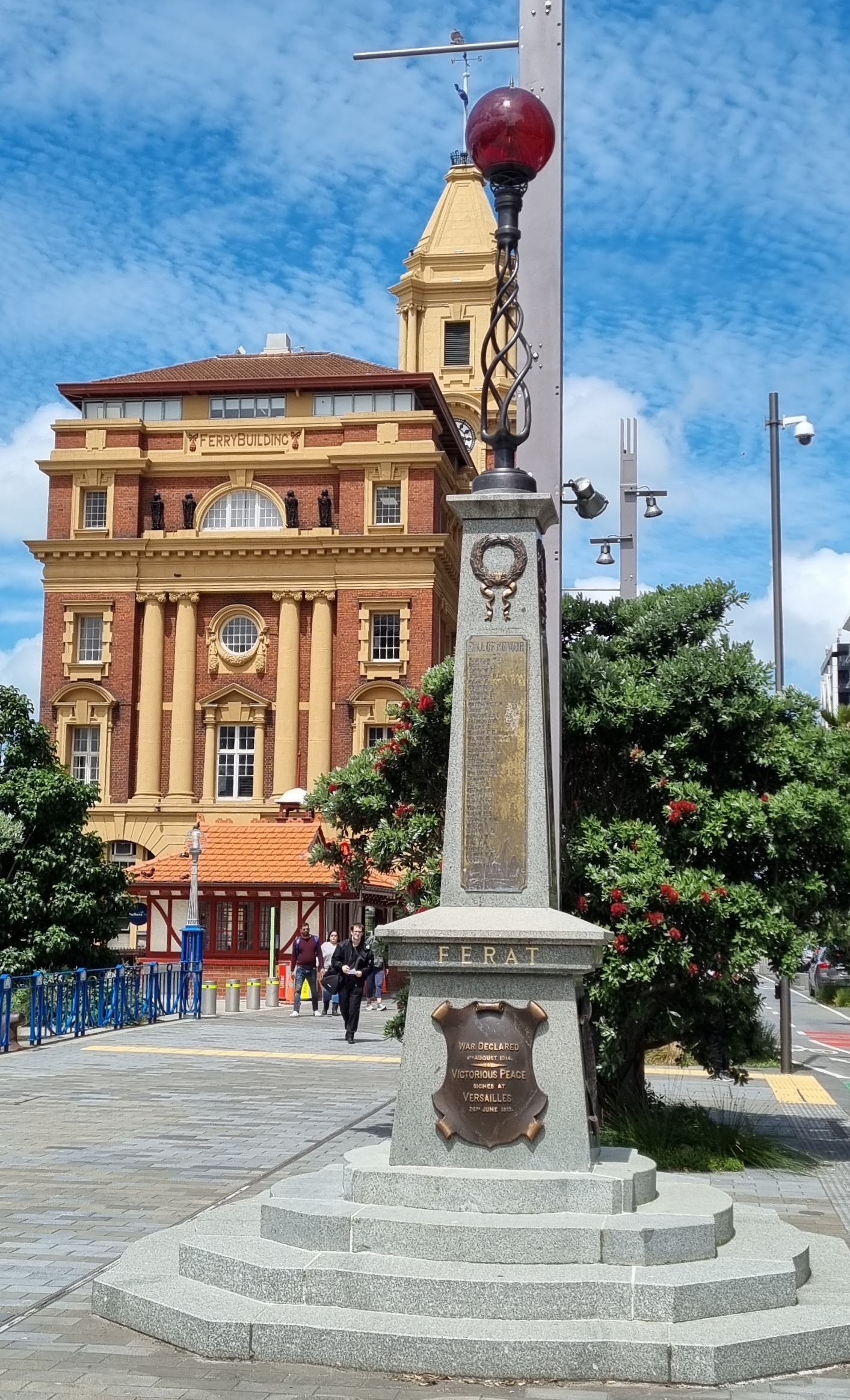
First World War Memorial Beacon on Quay Street (renovated and relocated next to Ferry Building)

The street was proposed in 1878 on reclaimed land and was in existence by the end of 1879. It was extended to the east to Campbell's Point (Judges Bay) in 1916.

Double railway tracks were in use down Quay Street connecting the Auckland Railway Station to the wharves until most were removed in 1985, and the final piece in 1989.

== Notable locations ==
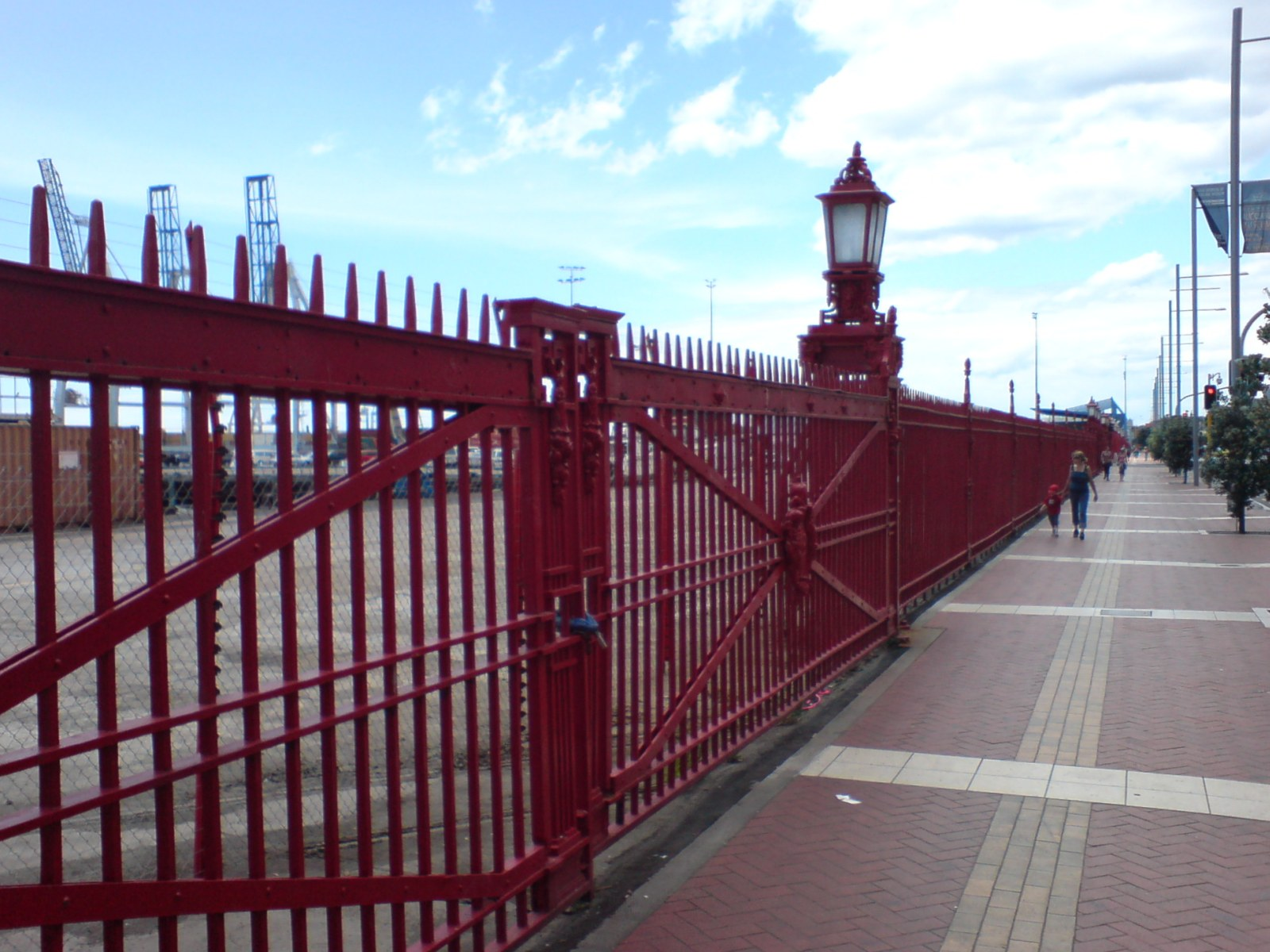
The iconic red fence separating the Port of Auckland customs area from the street

- Harbour Historic Area, north side of Quay Street, 1904-1924, wharves and associated buildings.
  - Launchman's Building, Quay Street West, 1930s, now New Zealand Maritime Museum.
  - First World War Memorial Beacon, Princes Wharf, 1915, earliest built monument for World War I in New Zealand.
  - Princes Wharf, 1929, cruise ship terminal and Hilton Hotel.
  - Wharf Pavilions, 1915, relocated 1923, two buildings, currently a booking office for Fullers360.
  - Ferry Building, 99 Quay Street, 1912, focus for Waitematā Harbour ferry traffic.
  - Queens Wharf, 1907-1913, significant part of Auckland's economy.
    - Queens Wharf Gates, north side of Quay Street on Queens Wharf, iconic red gates and fence.
- Quay Street Historic Area, south side of Quay Street East, 1874-1907, industrial buildings, offices and warehouses.
  - Wharf Police building, 102 Quay Street, 1903, Chelsea Sugar Refining Company headquarters 1903-1960.
  - Union Fish Company building, 116-118 Quay Street, 1906, car importing and engineering workshop 1906-1970s.
  - Northern Steamship Company building, 122-124 Quay Street, 1898, Northern Steamship Company offices 1898-1974.
- Auckland Harbour Board Workshops, 204 Quay Street, 1944-1989, site spread between Lower Hobson St, Customs Street and Quay Street, repair of boats, cranes and other equipment.
- Port of Auckland, container and trade port on the north side of Quay Street.
- Auckland City Arena, south side, 2007, sports and entertainment centre.

== Demographics ==
The Quay Street-Customs Street statistical area covers 1.22 km^{2} (0.47 sq mi) and had an estimated population of 2,090 as of June 2025, with a population density of 1,713 people per km^{2}.

Historical population
Year	Pop.	±% p.a.
2006	1,104	—
2013	2,256	+10.75%
2018	2,274	+0.16%
2023	1,962	−2.91%

Quay Street-Customs Street had a population of 1,962 in the 2023 New Zealand census, a decrease of 312 people (−13.7%) since the 2018 census, and a decrease of 294 people (−13.0%) since the 2013 census. There were 1,098 males, 858 females and 9 people of other genders in 1,065 dwellings. 8.4% of people identified as LGBTIQ+. The median age was 34.5 years (compared with 38.1 years nationally). There were 132 people (6.7%) aged under 15 years, 564 (28.7%) aged 15 to 29, 1,080 (55.0%) aged 30 to 64, and 186 (9.5%) aged 65 or older.

People could identify as more than one ethnicity. The results were 40.5% European (Pākehā); 8.3% Māori; 5.8% Pasifika; 48.3% Asian; 6.7% Middle Eastern, Latin American and African New Zealanders (MELAA); and 1.5% other, which includes people giving their ethnicity as "New Zealander". English was spoken by 94.0%, Māori language by 2.0%, Samoan by 0.8%, and other languages by 42.0%. No language could be spoken by 1.4% (e.g. too young to talk). New Zealand Sign Language was known by 0.3%. The percentage of people born overseas was 65.0, compared with 28.8% nationally.

Religious affiliations were 28.1% Christian, 6.9% Hindu, 4.4% Islam, 0.6% Māori religious beliefs, 2.9% Buddhist, 0.9% New Age, 0.2% Jewish, and 1.8% other religions. People who answered that they had no religion were 49.2%, and 5.4% of people did not answer the census question.

Of those at least 15 years old, 819 (44.8%) people had a bachelor's or higher degree, 612 (33.4%) had a post-high school certificate or diploma, and 402 (22.0%) people exclusively held high school qualifications. The median income was $47,100, compared with $41,500 nationally. 297 people (16.2%) earned over $100,000 compared to 12.1% nationally. The employment status of those at least 15 was that 1,089 (59.5%) people were employed full-time, 180 (9.8%) were part-time, and 93 (5.1%) were unemployed.

== Image gallery ==
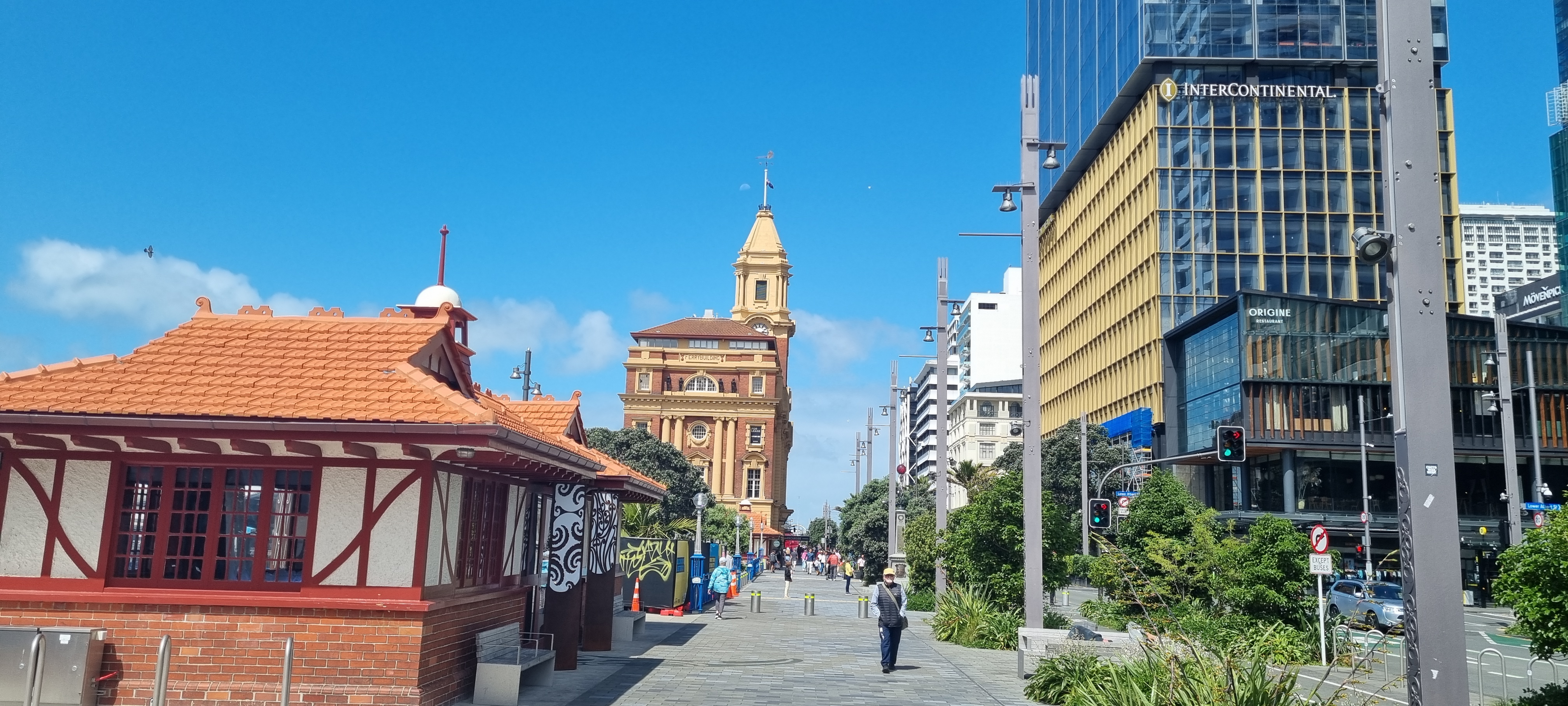
Wharf Pavilions and Ferry Building on Quay Street in 2023

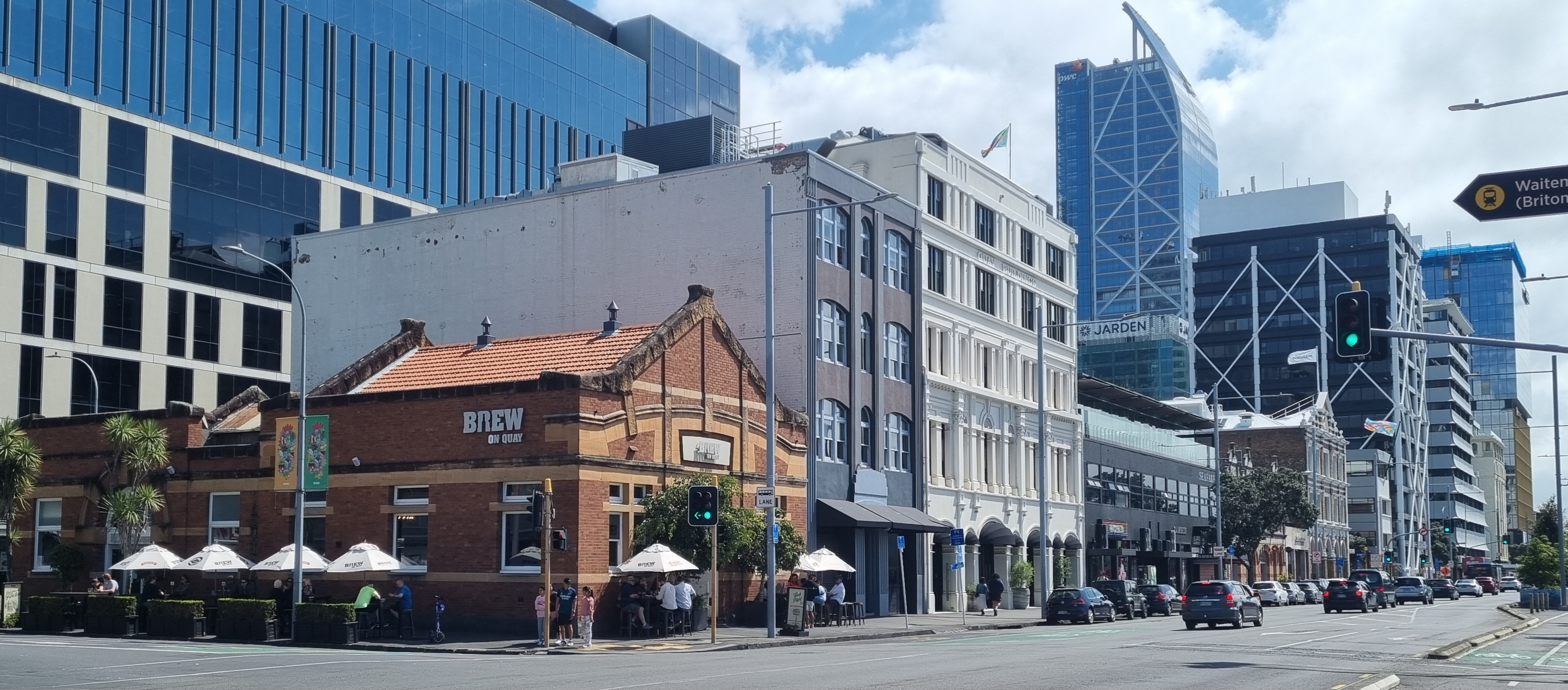
Former Wharf Police Building on Quay Street

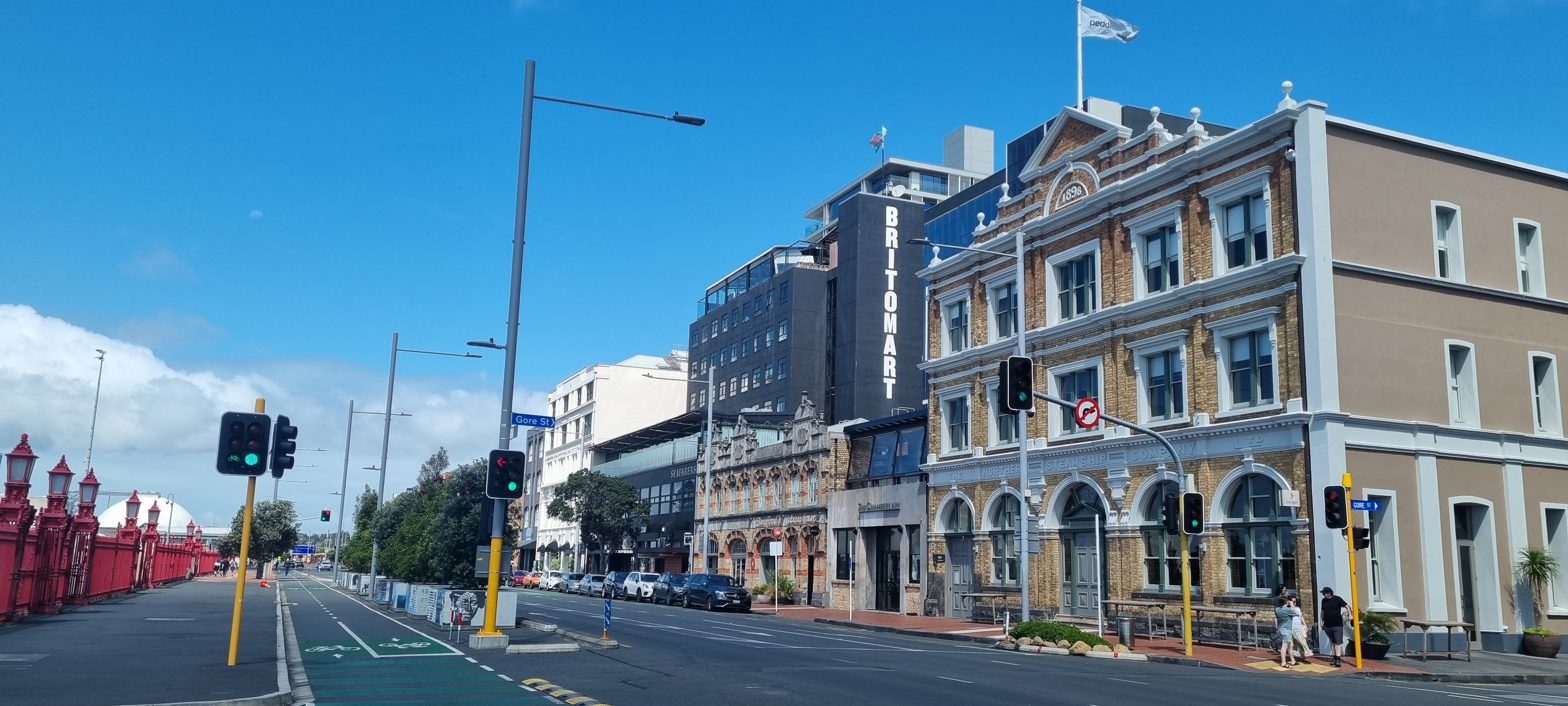
Northern Steamship Company and Union Fish Company Buildings

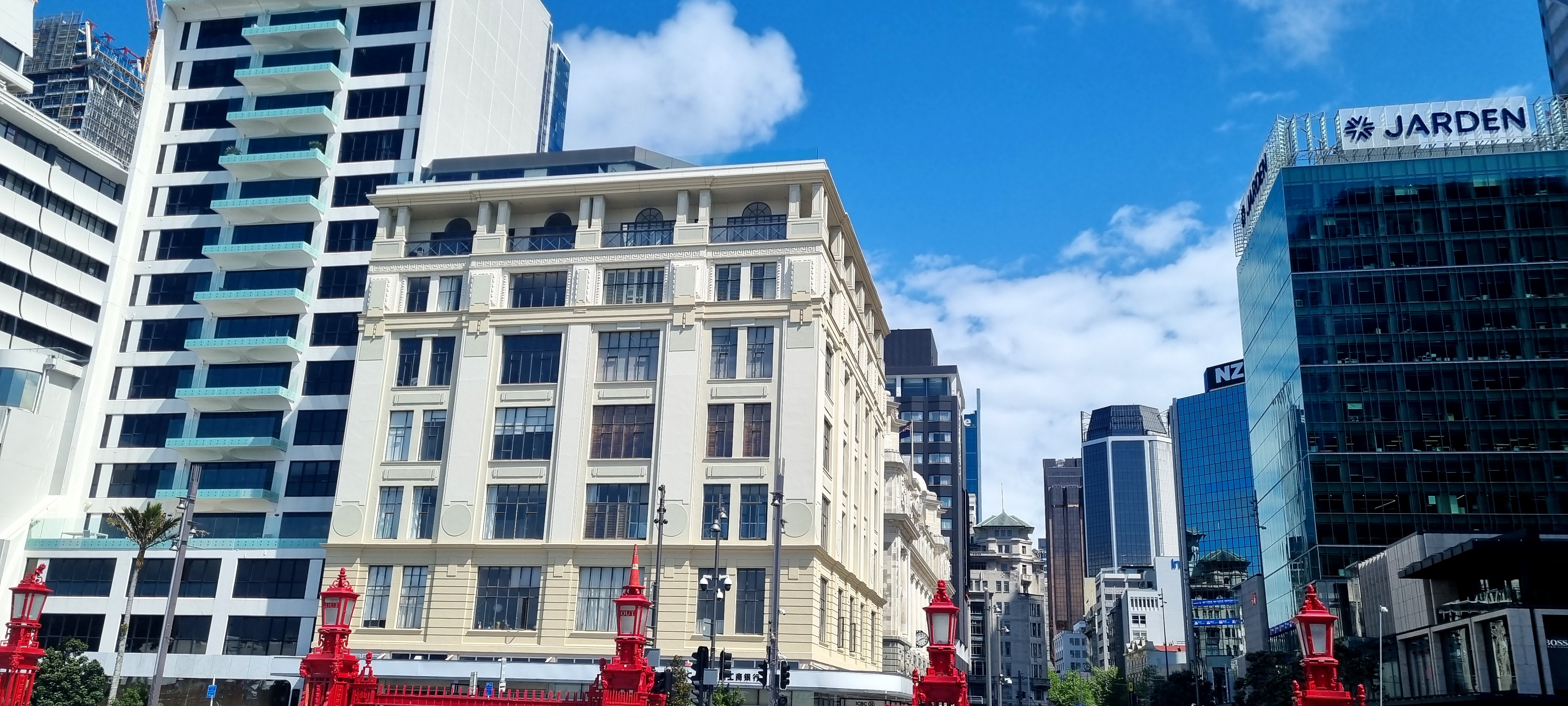
Endeans Building

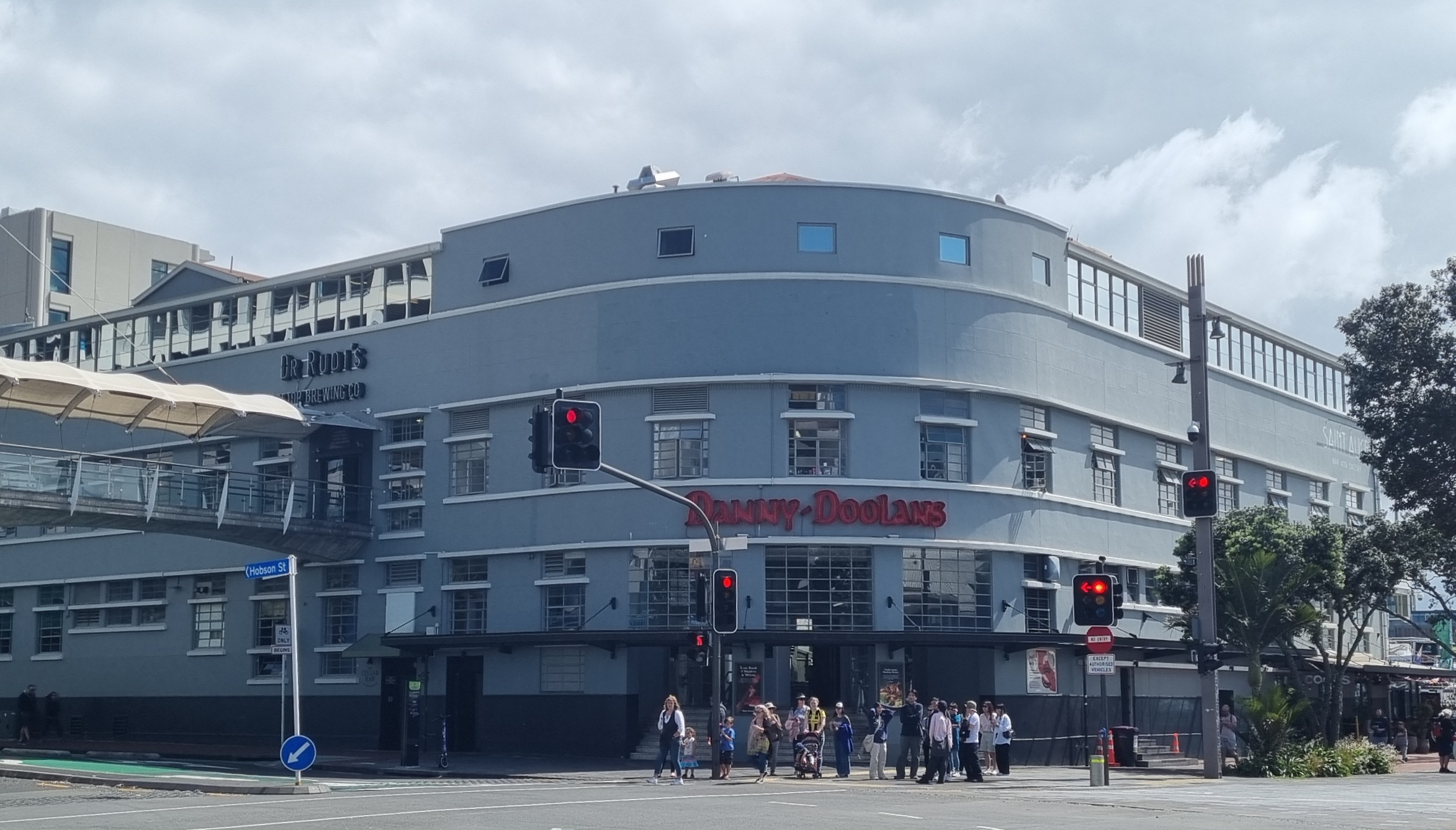
Former Auckland Harbour Board Workshops

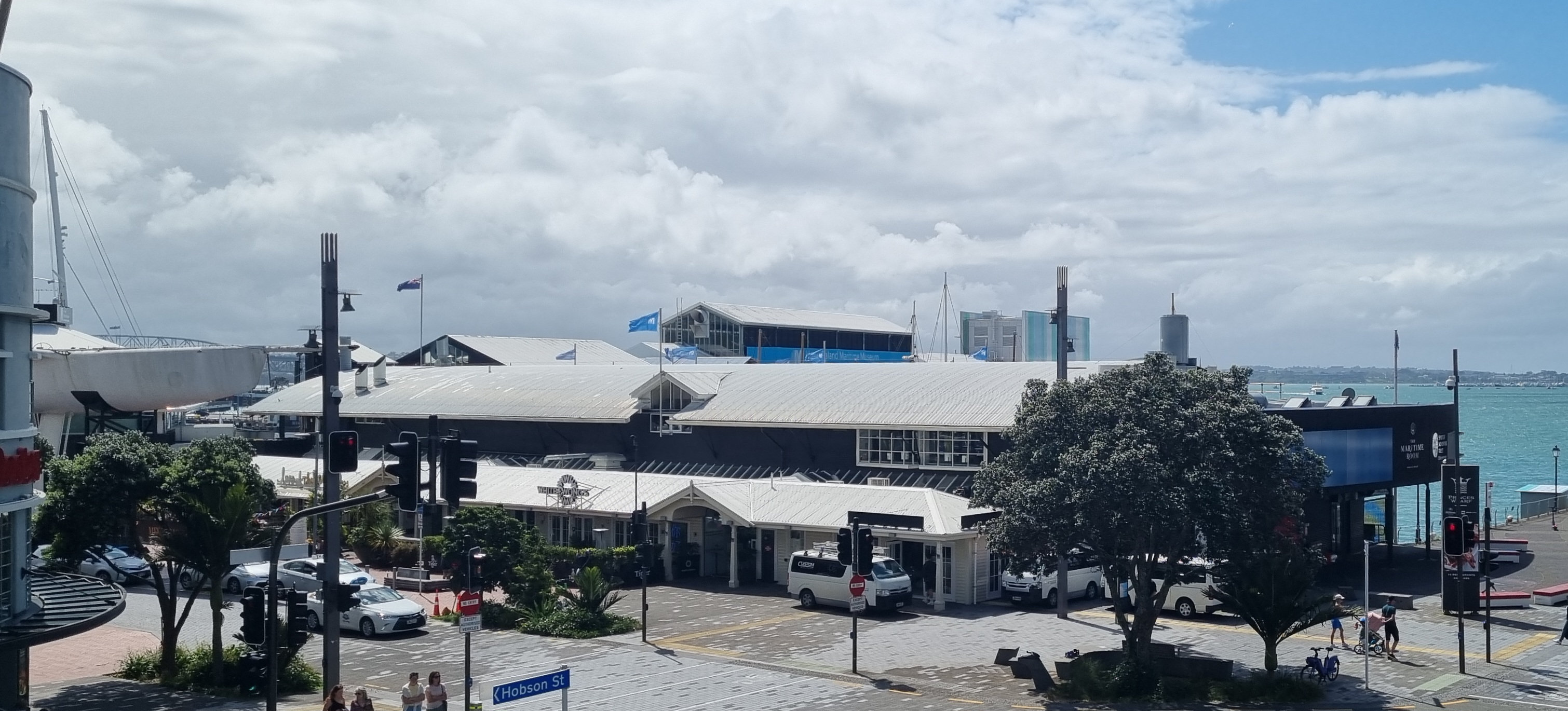
New Zealand Maritime Museum

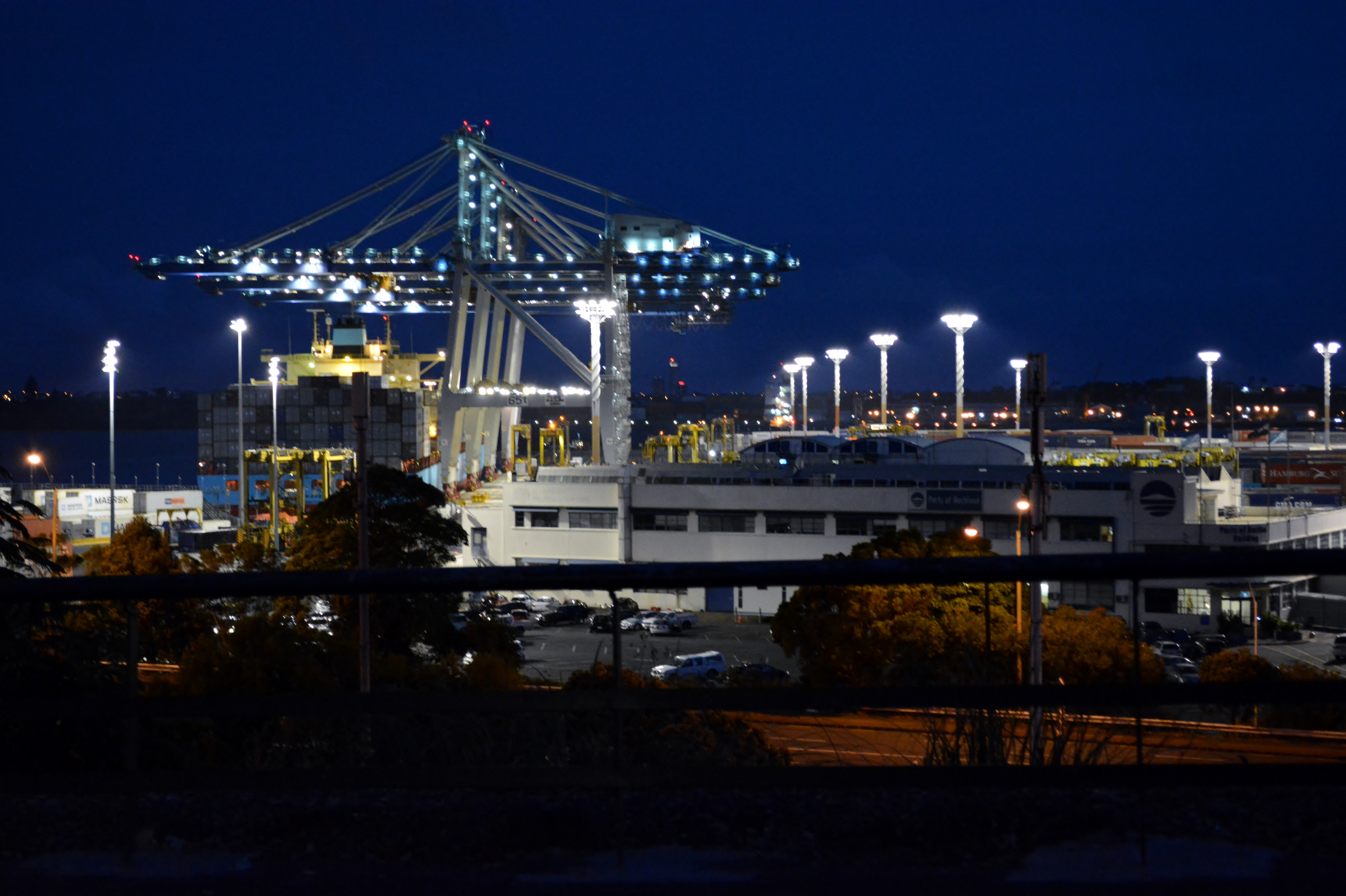
Port of Auckland
