= Charles Henry Carter =

Charles Henry Carter (29 October 1828 – 6 July 1914) was a Baptist missionary to Ceylon. Son of Thomas Carter, a stonemason, and his wife Anne (née Thomson), Charles Carter was raised near Leicester, UK. While working as a miller for an uncle, Carter was converted to Christianity. He was baptised at Arnesby by the Rev M. Davis. He began preaching and immediately gaining acceptance amongst the Baptists of Leicestershire.

== Studies and aptitude ==
He enrolled himself at Horton College in 1849 and applied himself with zeal to the study of Hebrew, Greek and logic. Such was his academic prowess that he remained without peer during his studies.

He volunteered for service in India but his destination was altered to Ceylon. The change in plans was considered providential. His replacement for India perished in Delhi during the Great Mutiny. (New Zealand Baptist 1914).

In addition to his Hebrew and Greek, Carter would become fluent in Sanskrit, Bengali, Tamil and Pali. His passion however, would always be Sinhalese.

Upon his arrival at Point de Galle on 23 September that year, Carter set about learning Sinhalese from a 12-year-old native boy. Such was his command of the language Carter was preaching to the natives in Singalese in four months.

Bishop Coppelstone, Anglican Primate of India is said to have described Carter as the "foremost Sinhalese scholar of this age". (New Zealand Baptist 1914).

== Missionary work ==
In 1855 Carter entered upon his work in Kandy acting as Pastor of the Kandy Church. He also took upon missioning to the surrounding villages and coffee estates. While in service there Carter began work on a Sinhalese New Testament. In 1862 Carter was forced to New Zealand to recuperate from a throat condition. By this time his New Testament had been completed and by 1869 he had returned to Ceylon and had turned his attention to the Old Testament. By 1881 his health deteriorated again and he was forced to return to New Zealand.

== Literary works ==
Extraordinarily Carter translated from the Greek and Hebrew texts, not the English. The Sinhalese work was done in vernacular language, that it could embody the divine message in a dialect that was understood by the people everywhere (Lapham 1903). His works include:

- Sinhalese New Testament 1855
- Sinhalese Book of Psalms 1863
- Sinhalese Old Testament 1869
- English – Sinhalese Dictionary 1881
- Sinhalese – English Dictionary 1889

== Later years ==
Upon his retirement from missionary life, Carter became Pastor of the Ponsonby Baptist Church in New Zealand. He was the first president of the Baptist Union of New Zealand. While in retirement he compiled a Sinhalese – English dictionary and made the third revision of his Sinhalese bible, alleged by some to be one of the finest biblical translations of the day (New Zealand Baptist 1914). He also became a student of hymnology. The Carter family home was in Harcourt Street, Grey Lynn, Auckland New Zealand.

== Family ==
Carter married Hannah Morton on 16 June 1853. They had six children and a numerous grandchildren. A dedicated family man, Carter delighted in his grandchildren, and instilled in them a sense of Christian duty.

== Books ==
- Charles Carter. A Sinhalese-English dictionary. Colombo: The "Ceylon Observer" Printing Works; London: Probsthain & Co., 1924.
- Carter C, A Sinhalese-English Bible ISBN 81-206-1174-8.
