= 1950 New Year Honours (New Zealand) =

Annual awards for New Zealanders

The 1950 New Year Honours in New Zealand were appointments by King George VI on the advice of the New Zealand government to various orders and honours to reward and highlight good works by New Zealanders. The awards celebrated the passing of 1949 and the beginning of 1950, and were announced on 2 January 1950.

The recipients of honours are displayed here as they were styled before their new honour.

== Knight Bachelor ==
- Alexander Howat Johnstone OBE KC – of Auckland; vice president of the New Zealand Law Society for many years. For public services.
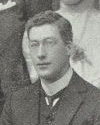
Sir Alexander Johnstone

== Order of Saint Michael and Saint George ==
=== Companion (CMG) ===
- William Hollis Cocker – of Auckland. For outstanding services in the fields of university administration and adult education.
- Eric Howard Manley Luke MB ChB – of Wellington; a surgeon at the Wellington Public Hospital for over 25 years and chairman of the Council, British Medical Association (New Zealand branch).

== Order of the British Empire ==
=== Knight Commander (KBE) ===
Civil division

- John Robert McKenzie – of Christchurch. For public and philanthropic services.

Military division

- Air Vice-Marshal Arthur de Terrotte Nevill CB CBE – Royal New Zealand Air Force.
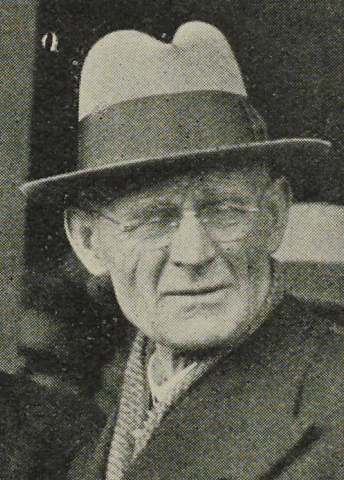
Sir John McKenzie

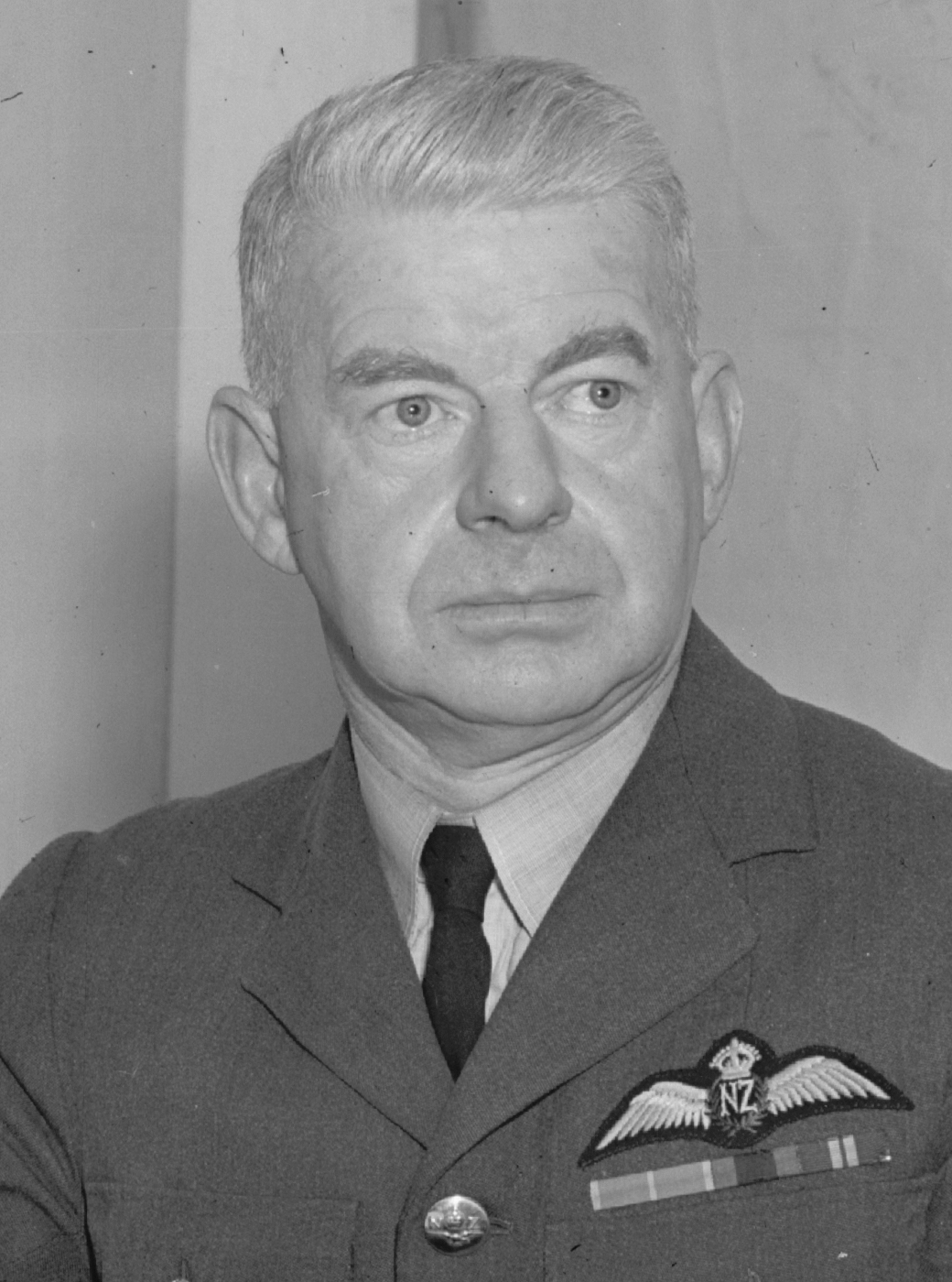
Sir Arthur Nevill

=== Commander (CBE) ===
Civil division

- James Cummings – of Wellington; Commissioner of Police.
- Mary Isabel Lambie OBE – of Wellington; director, Nursing Division, Department of Health for the past 18 years.
- Frederick George Soper PhD DSc FRIC – of Dunedin; professor of chemistry, University of Otago. For public services.
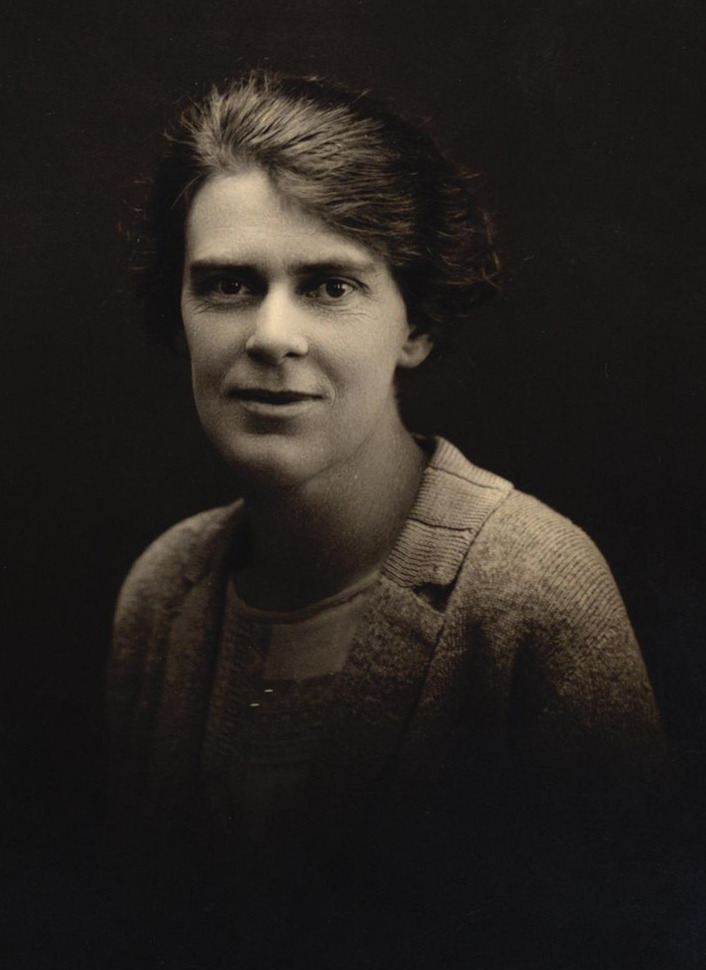
Mary Lambie

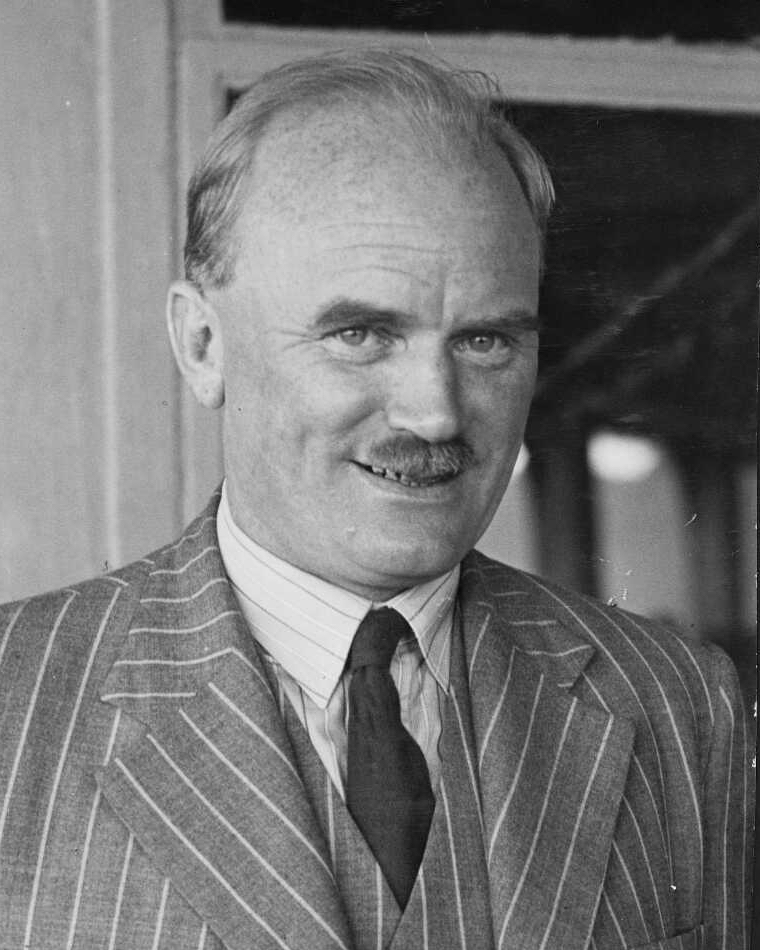
Frederick Soper

=== Officer (OBE) ===
Civil division

- Harold Edward Annett DSc – of Hamilton. For valuable services in connexion with agricultural and scientific research in New Zealand.
- Clifford Oswald Bell – of Wellington; Dominion vice president of the Returned Services Association.
- John Bitchener – of Waimate. For municipal and public services.
- Helen McDonald Findlay – of Christchurch; matron in charge of the Templeton Home for Backward Children, Christchurch.
- Robert Searson Rodney Francis MB ChB – of Hastings. For services to the community in connexion with the treatment of tuberculosis.
- Herbert Hill – of Christchurch. For valuable services during the war years as organiser and controller of the wool appraisal system.
- Wharemaihi Hotu – of Hangatiki. For services to the Māori people as an elder of the Maniapoto tribe.
- The Reverend John James North DD – of Auckland. For services to the Baptist organisation in New Zealand.
- Sydney Bach Smith – of Dunedin; chairman, Dunedin branch, Disabled Servicemen's Re-establishment League, since 1931.

Military division

- Commander Richard Everley Washbourn DSO – Royal Navy.
- Brigadier William George Gentry DSO OBE – adjutant-general, New Zealand Military Forces, and second military member of the Army Board.
- Wing Commander William Glanville Woodward – Royal New Zealand Air Force.
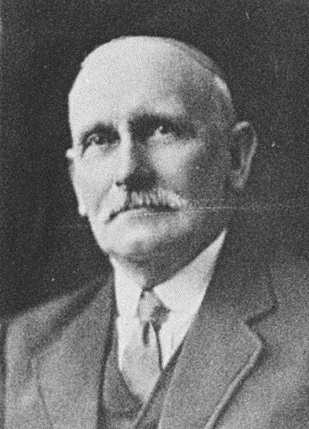
John Bitchener

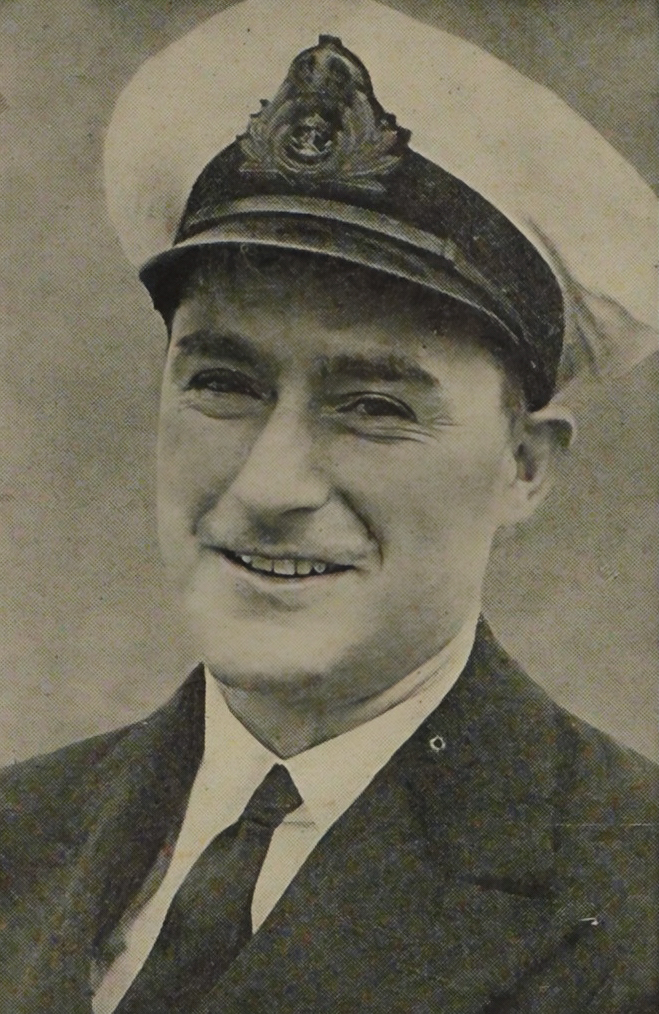
Richard Washbourn

=== Member (MBE) ===
Civil division

- Sybil Mary Beresford – of Lawrence; matron in charge of Tuapeka Public Hospital for the past 25 years.
- Maud Booth Bowyer – of Honikiwi. For patriotic services.
- David Hazeel Cockburn – of Queenstown. For services in connexion with local-body affairs for many years.
- Wilfred John Davies – of Oamaru. For services to the St John's Ambulance Brigade during the past 43 years.
- Winefride Mary Dive JP – of Wellington; secretary, Society for the Protection of Women and Children.
- Ethel Mary Le Lievre – of Akaroa. For social welfare services in the Akaroa district.
- Thomas McGhie – of Ngakawau. For services as superintendent of the Buller State Mines and in connexion with the establishment of the community centre movement for miners.
- Margaret Vivien Miller – of Nelson. For services in connexion with voluntary relief work in the Nelson district during the past 30 years.
- Elsie Mitchell – of Lower Hutt. For services to the Red Cross, children's health camps, and patriotic bodies.
- Irene Grace Owen – of Hastings; matron in charge of the maternity annex at the Memorial Hospital, Hastings, for 20 years.
- Ihakara Rapana – of Hastings. For social-welfare services rendered to the Māori people, particularly in the Church of England sphere.
- Seymour Percy Spiller – of Napier. For social-welfare services.
- Albert James Stratford JP – of Auckland. For services in connexion with the Justices of the Peace Association since 1918.
- Ina Coralie Wilks ARRC – of Auckland; matron in charge of St Dunstan's Hospital, Auckland.

Military division

- Lieutenant (S) Thomas Lewis Luckman – Royal New Zealand Navy.
- Stanley Austin Higgs – senior commissioned wardmaster, Royal New Zealand Navy.
- Honorary Captain Cecil Herbert Hoskin – New Zealand Territorial Force.
- Warrant Officer 1st Class William Sampson Valentine – Royal New Zealand Army Ordnance Corps.
- Flight Lieutenant Sidney Maxwell Hope – Royal New Zealand Air Force.
- Warrant Officer Richard Hermann Simpson – Royal New Zealand Air Force.

== British Empire Medal (BEM) ==
Military division

- Chief Engine Room Artificer Percival Roland Honton – Royal New Zealand Navy.
- Chief Petty Officer Ivan Cassell Brown – Royal New Zealand Naval Volunteer Reserve.
- Chief Petty Officer Stoker Mechanic John Edward Leon Sevi – Royal New Zealand Navy.
- Petty Officer Keith Leonard Wadham – Royal New Zealand Naval Volunteer Reserve.
- Master-at-Arms William Vernon Cyril Hogan – Royal New Zealand Navy.
- Sergeant Joan Pamela Smith – New Zealand Women's Army Auxiliary Corps.
- Flight Sergeant Hilton Bravener Fowler – Royal New Zealand Air Force.
- Flight Sergeant Leslie Frankin Gibbs – Royal New Zealand Air Force.
- Flight Sergeant James Ernest Charles Price – Royal New Zealand Air Force.
- Sergeant Jean Mary Murtagh – New Zealand Women's Auxiliary Air Force.

== Royal Red Cross ==
=== Associate (ARRC) ===
- Charge Sister Phyllis Irene Johnston – New Zealand Army Nursing Service.

== Air Force Cross (AFC) ==
- Flight Lieutenant Alwyn Lennox Parlane – Royal New Zealand Air Force.

== King's Commendation for Valuable Service in the Air ==
- Master Signaller Horace James Haberfield – Royal New Zealand Air Force.
- Flying Officer Arthur Cyril Hilliam – Royal New Zealand Air Force.
