= Alexander Wiseman (architect) =

New Zealand architect and artist (1865–1915)

- Born: March 21, 1865; Fort Street, Auckland, New Zealand
- Died: September 21, 1915 (aged 50); Epsom
- Occupation: Architect
- Years active: 1904–1913
- Buildings: Auckland Ferry Terminal

Alexander Wiseman was a New Zealand architect and musician. Wiseman's passion was music, being selected as church organist at 14, but at his father's behest he apprenticed to architect Edward Bartley. Wiseman was a prominent organist in Auckland but moved to Victoria to be with his lover. In Victoria Wiseman became a conductor and wrote music; however, he struggled to make a living from music and later worked as a tuner and repairman for instruments before having to return to Auckland when that was not enough to sustain his income. Wiseman's early contracts were obtained due to his familial connections, especially with the Methodist Church. From this work Wiseman became a well-known architect and designed many other buildings, several of which are heritage listed. Wiseman's most notable works are the Auckland Ferry Building, the Collins Bros & Co Warehouse, the Auckland Hospital Board Building, and four shops on Queen Street.

== Early life ==
An image that may be of Wiseman in his youth

Alexander Wiseman was born to James Wiseman and Margaret Barlow in Fort Street, Auckland on 21 March 1865. Wiseman was born into an upper-class family that was well connected in Auckland. Wiseman was one of 13 children and was not destined to inherit his father's saddlery business. Wiseman was a talented musician being selected as the organist at age 14 for the Parnell Wesleyan Church.

== Architectural apprenticeship ==
At the age of 16 Wiseman was apprenticed to Edward Bartley for a period of 4 years. Wiseman's father paid £50 for the apprenticeship; James Wiseman wanted to ensure his son had a viable career prospect when older. During Wiseman's apprenticeship Bartley worked on numerous significant projects including St John's Church, Ponsonby, the Auckland Synagogue, the Auckland Savings Bank Building, St Jude's Church, Avondale, and Coombes' Arcade. The extent, if any, of Wiseman's involvement in these projects is unknown. Bartley certified Wiseman as a draughtsman at the end of the apprenticeship, stating Wiseman was a: 'painstaking and careful draughtsman — courteous and willing at all times.' It is not known if Wiseman worked on any architectural projects after this but he was recorded as a draughtsman in the 1890 electoral roll.

== Musical career ==
Wiseman still wished to pursue music and in the 1880s practiced the organ under Neville Barnett. Wiseman succeeded Barnett as the organist for St Matthew-in-the-City in 1887 and began teaching students the organ, piano, and harmonium the following year. By 1893 Wiseman had moved to Mooroopna, Victoria, Australia. On 17 June 1893 Wiseman married Harriet Coombes in the Clarendon Street Presbyterian church in Melbourne. Edward Bartley had designed an arcade for Samuel Coombes, Harriet's father, in Auckland and the Coombes family left for Victoria shortly later after becoming bankrupt: it is likely that Wiseman had met Harriet during his time working with Bartley and moved to Victoria to be with her.

Wiseman and his wife moved to Shepparton where he became conductor of an orchestra and choir. Wiseman's career was reported on back home by the New Zealand Herald which noted he had written an introduction to a cantata and a piano march called Akarana (Note: Akarana is the Maori language name for Auckland) March. Despite the positive review in the Herald Wiseman is not known to have written any other pieces and by 1900 was living Surrey Hills, Melbourne offering his services as a piano and organ repairer and tuner.

Despite not being able to make a living from music Wiseman continued his musical career back in Auckland serving as the organist for St John's Church, Ponsonby and the Pitt Street Methodist Church.

== Architectural career ==
The Collins Bro & Co Warehouse was described as 'Auckland's first skyscraper' and was the tallest building in the city

By 1903 Wiseman and his family returned to Auckland and he returned to architecture. Wiseman had many commissions after returning and in 1907 designed a 10 room house in Epsom for his wife and 7 children. Wiseman undertook a lot of work for the Methodist Church; Wiseman's father was prominent in the Methodist Church which likely gave Wiseman preferential selection for Methodist tenders. Notable Methodist buildings designed by Wiseman include the Buckland Methodist Church, East Street Methodist Hall, and the Epsom Methodist Church. Other ecclesiastical structures of Wiseman's include the Anglican St John's Church, Waihi and a school hall for the Presbyterian St Stephen's Church, Ponsonby. Wiseman's connections with Methodism also likely earnt him the tender for the Auckland YMCA Building: the president of the Auckland YMCA branch at the time was the Wesleyan minister Andrew Caughey. Perhaps encouraged by this tender Wiseman entered and won the design competition for the YMCA building in Whanganui.

In June 1907 Wiseman was hired to design a ferry building for the Auckland Harbour Board. The grand Edwardian building cost £68,000 and is registered as a category 1 building with Heritage New Zealand. Wiseman's brother-in-law became chairman of the Auckland Harbour Board during this project and Wiseman was architect for the harbour board during his brother-in-law's chairmanship; however, Wiseman was likely appointed due to satisfaction with his work on the ferry building rather than from any preferential treatment from his brother-in-law. In 1908 Wiseman designed four shops on Queen Street for his brother-in-law, Neville Newcomb. These buildings collectively form part of a category 1 heritage listing.

Wiseman designed many domiciles for notable Aucklanders including Methodist trustee George Winstone and Marinoto for Doctor William Henry Parkes, who likely hired Wiseman due to his experience playing the organ as a key feature of the property was a pipe organ room.

Wiseman had three apprentices: Alfred John Brown, who moved to Australia and worked as a town planner; Horace Lovell Massey, 4 time recipient of the NZIA Gold Medal; and Edward George Le Petit.

Wiseman's output dropped off after 1913 due to declining health and he died at his house on 21 September 1915. Wiseman was buried at Purewa Cemetery. Despite a short career Wiseman secured many prominent contracts, in part due to his family and in part due to this architectural prowess.

== List of buildings ==
Name	Date	Image	Note	Ref
Buckland Methodist Church	1904		Converted into a private residence in 1986	
St John's Church, Waihi	1906		Registered as a category 2 building with Heritage New Zealand	
Shelford	1907		Shelford was designed as his family home	
Auckland Training College	1907			
Collins Bros. & Co Warehouse	1907		The tallest building in Auckland at one time. Also known as Cathedral House. Scheduled as a category B building with Auckland Council	
St Stephen's Church, Ponsonby school hall	1907			
East Street Methodist Hall	1908			
Terrace of Shops, Queen Street	1908		Wiseman only designed 4 out of the 12 shops, specifically the four in shown in the image. The entire row of 12 shops are registered as a category 1 building with Heritage New Zealand	
Auckland Ferry Building	1910		Registered as a category 1 building with Heritage New Zealand	
Epsom Methodist Church	1910			
Auckland Hospital Board Building	1911		Registered as a category 2 building with Heritage New Zealand	
Queen's Wharf Police and Customs Offices	1911		Demolished in 1970s	
Whanganui YMCA building	1912		Demolished	
Russell Methodist Church	1912			
Greenacres	n.d.		Owned by the Tongan Royal Family	
Tibbs House	n.d.			
Marinoto	n.d.		Demolished	
Ponsonby Baptist Church hall	1905		Architect is unknown but strongly suspected to be Wiseman	
