= Auckland Ferry Terminal =

Historic ferry building in Auckland, New Zealand

Coordinates: 36.843°S 174.767°E

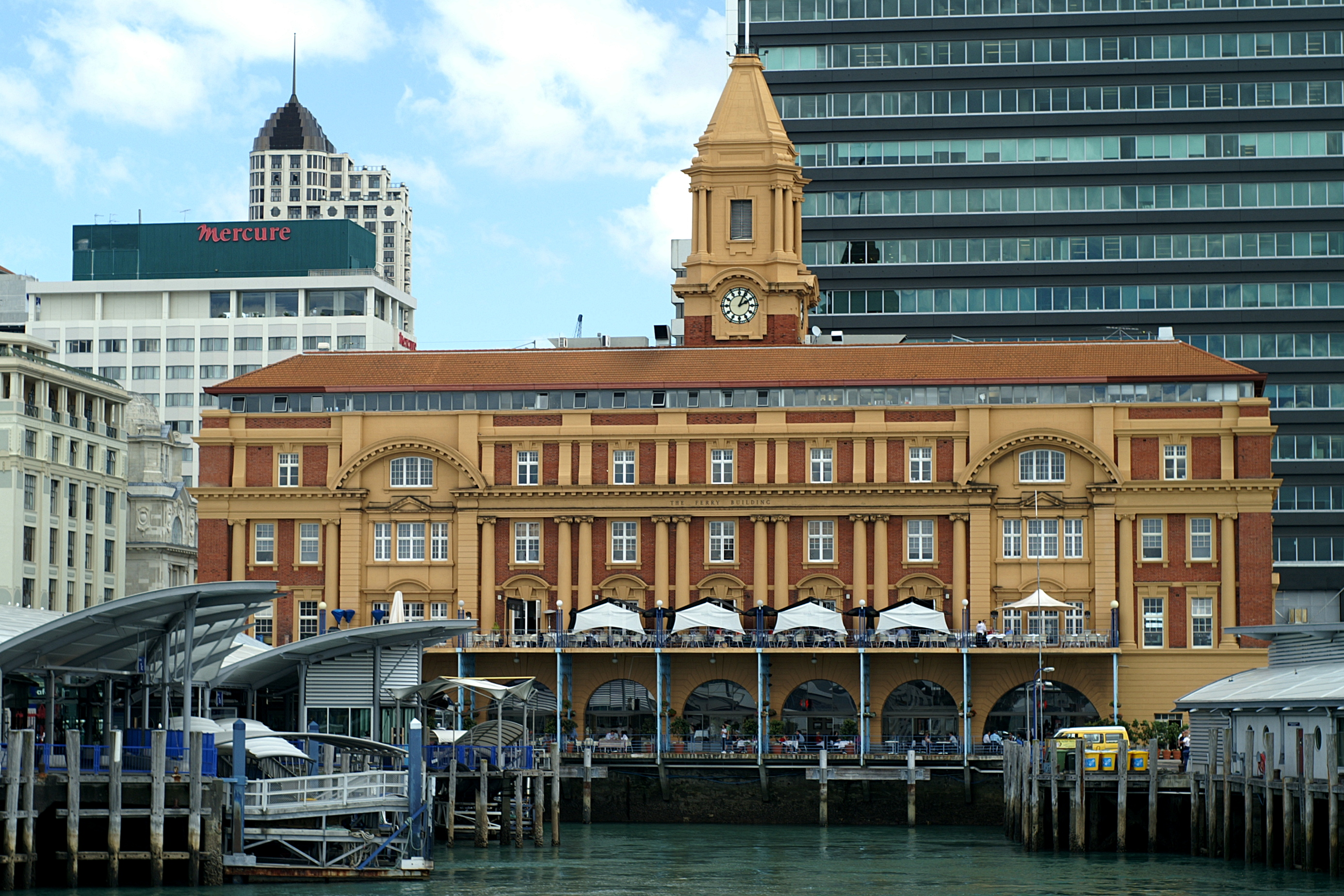
- The ferry terminal from the harbour in 2006
- Alternative names: Downtown Ferry Terminal

General information
- Type: Ferry building
- Architectural style: Edwardian Baroque
- Construction started: 1909
- Completed: 1912
- Renovated: 1986–1988
- Cost: £68,000
- Client: Auckland Harbour Board

Design and construction
- Architect: Alexander Wiseman
- Main contractor: Philcox and Sons

Heritage New Zealand – Category 1
- Designated: 25 November 1982
- Reference no.: 102

The Auckland Ferry Terminal, also called the Downtown Ferry Terminal, is the hub of the Auckland ferry network, connecting the city centre with coastal and inner-harbour suburbs and islands of the Hauraki Gulf. It is located on the southern edge of the Waitemata Harbour and bounded by Quay Street.

The Edwardian Baroque Ferry Building is the focal point of the ferry terminal, with ferries departing from in front of it at a modern terminal constructed in 2021.

== Ferry Building ==
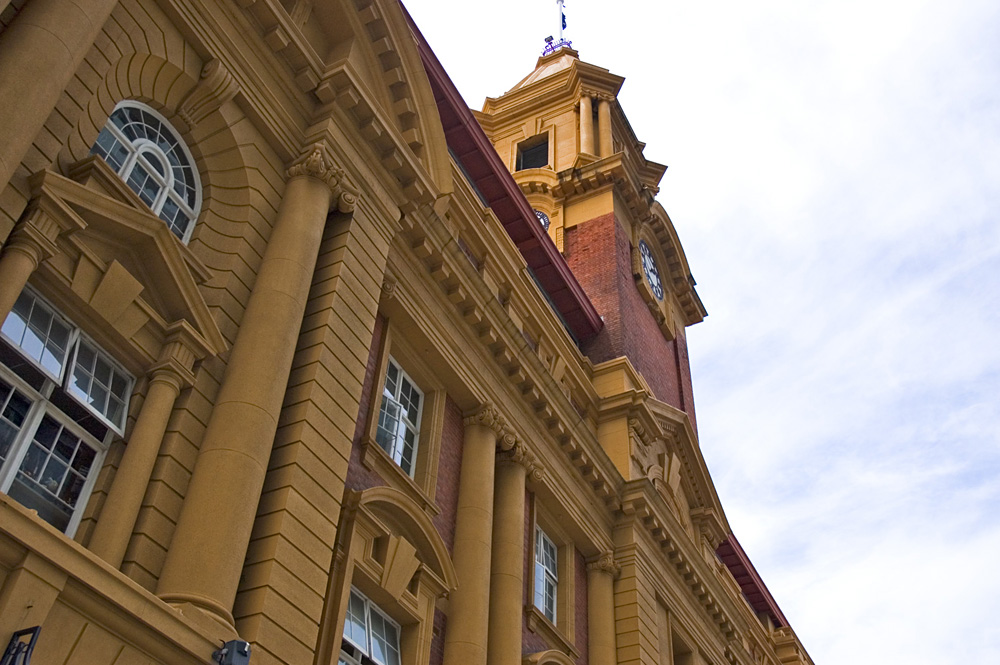
The Edwardian building, from Quay Street

By the early 20th century, the Auckland Harbour Board recognised the need for a dedicated ferry building in Auckland. In May 1907 Alexander Wiseman was appointed architect for the project. Original plans were for a five-storey structure, but after public outrage at the height, a design of four storeys and a clock tower was proposed. The plan was similar to that of the San Francisco Ferry Building. In June 1911 Wiseman advised the Auckland Harbour Board that £3,000 could be saved by leaving out the tower but the board rejected this proposal and the building was completed with the clocktower at a cost of £68,000. It was constructed by Philcox & Sons from 1909 to 1912, and is made of sandstone and brick with a base of Coromandel granite, on reclaimed land. Wiseman's brother-in-law was elected chairman of the harbour board in 1911 and Wiseman was hired as the Auckland Harbour Board architect during his chairmanship; however, the reason for his selection is likely due to his fine job on the ferry building rather than any influence of his brother-in-law. The ferry building was not built as part of the terminal but instead was designed to serve as a focal point for the Auckland ferry service and to provide income for the harbour board via leases. The main ferry operators, the Devonport Steam Ferry Company and the Takapuna Tramways Ferry Company, both had headquarters in the building.

The ferry building was the major departure point for people travelling to the North Shore until 1959, when the Auckland Harbour Bridge was opened. This led to a decline in ferry traffic and a slow decline for the building.

A new ferry building was built next to it in 1982 and a report released that year said that extensive renovations were needed to bring the Edwardian building up to earthquake and fire code standards. The Harbour Board were divided over whether to keep the building, but following strong public opinion decided to renovate it. It was extensively restored from 1986 and reopened by the Governor General on 5 November 1988.

== New ferry terminal ==
In 2021 Auckland Transport invested $42 million creating six new ferry berths to expand the capacity to several thousand passengers an hour, a capacity that is unlikely to be reached for several decades.

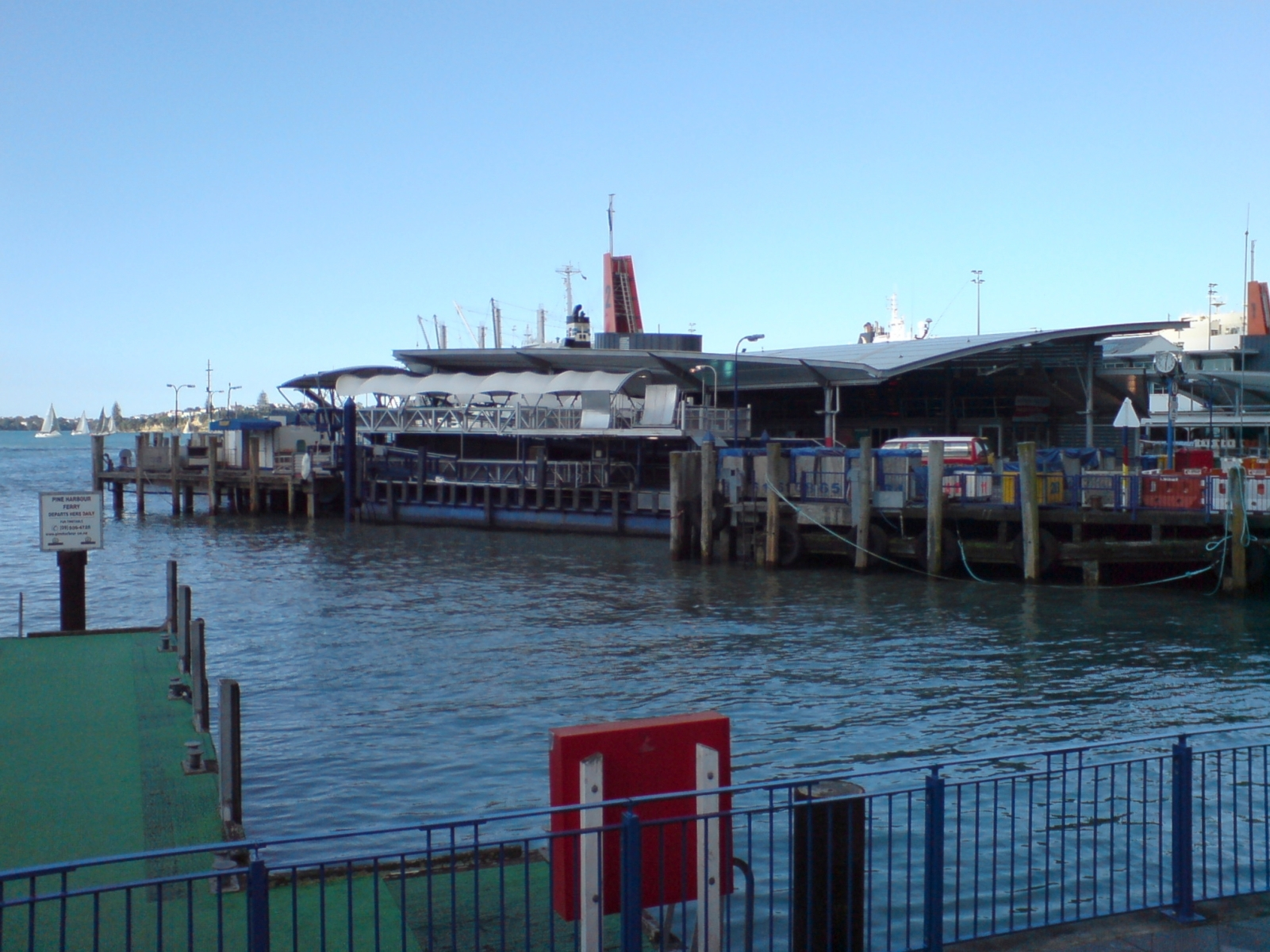
Terminal structures in 2007

The more contemporary ferry piers and waiting area were constructed mostly as an open-sided structure with a curved seagull/sail-roof, which together with ornamental turrets is designed to evoke ships berthed behind the original building. It also needed to be of a low profile to retain building views, and was designed by architect Murray Day to be easily maintainable and expandable.
