= Rosemary Riddell =

New Zealand actor, film director and judge

- Born: Auckland
- Occupations: Actor, film director and Family Court judge
- Notable work: The Insatiable Moon

Rosemary Riddell is an actor, film director and Family Court judge from New Zealand.

Riddell was born and educated in Auckland. She began her career working in broadcasting and public relations, then went overseas and met her husband Mike Riddell in London. After their three children had started school, Riddell enrolled to study law at university, and was admitted to the bar in 1992. She worked in family law for Gaze Burt in Auckland, and in 1997 she moved to Dunedin to join Gallaway Haggitt Sinclair. She was made a partner in the firm in 1999. Riddell has served as a Council member of the Otago District Law Society, and President of the Otago Women Lawyers Society. She was appointed a Family Court judge in 2006, and sat in Hamilton for 12 years before retiring, after which she wrote the book To Be Fair: Confessions of a District Court Judge.

Riddell began acting at the Downstage Theatre in Wellington in the 1970s. In 2007, her short film Cake Tin won the Sandcastle Award at the 2007 Moondance Film Festival. In 2009, Riddell directed a feature film The Insatiable Moon, based on a novel by her husband Mike Riddell. She has been Deputy Chair of the Fortune Theatre Board in Dunedin.
