= Alfred North (jurist) =

New Zealand jurist (1900–1981)

The Right Honourable Sir Alfred North KBE QC
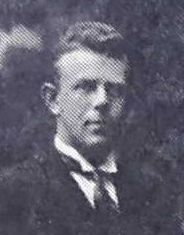
- North as a young man

President of the Court of Appeal
- In office 1963–1972
- Preceded by: Kenneth Gresson
- Succeeded by: Alexander Turner

Personal details
- Born: Alfred Kingsley North; 17 December 1900 Christchurch, New Zealand
- Died: 22 June 1981 (aged 80) Auckland, New Zealand
- Parent: John North (father)

Sir Alfred Kingsley North KBE PC QC (17 December 1900 – 22 June 1981), also known as Alf North, was a New Zealand lawyer and judge. He was President of the Court of Appeal of New Zealand from 1963 until his retirement in 1972.

== Biography ==
North was born in Christchurch in 1900, the son of Baptist minister John North. As a teenager, North contracted polio and had a limp for the rest of his life. He received his education at West Christchurch District High School, Christchurch Boys' High School, and then attended Canterbury University College, graduating LLM in 1927.

He first practiced in Ashburton from 1921. After obtaining his Master of Laws, he was in partnership in Hāwera. From 1935, he was a barrister and a partner in the legal firm Earl, Kent, Stanton, Massey, North and Palmer in Auckland, replacing Erima Northcroft who had been appointed judge. In 1951, North was appointed judge of the Supreme Court. When the Court of Appeal was reconstituted in Wellington in 1957, North was one of its founding members and relocated to the capital city, where he lived in Wadestown. North was the president of the Court of Appeal from 1963 to 1972.

Between 1976 and 1978, North conducted a commission of inquiry into an alleged breach of confidentiality of the police file on Colin Moyle.

For the respective Auckland branches, North was president for Rotary and chairman of the New Zealand Crippled Children's Society.

== Family ==
On 31 December 1924, North married Thelma Areta Dawson (1902–1991) at Oxford Terrace Baptist Church in Christchurch, with his father officiating the ceremony. North died on 22 June 1981 in Auckland. His wife survived him by ten years. Both were cremated at Purewa Cemetery and Crematorium.

== Honours ==
Alongside Ossie Mazengarb, North was appointed King's Counsel on 18 April 1947. In 1953, he was awarded the Queen Elizabeth II Coronation Medal. He was made a Knight Bachelor in the 1959 Queen's Birthday Honours. In the 1964 New Year Honours, he was appointed a Knight Commander of the Order of the British Empire. He was made a Privy Counsellor in 1966.

== See also ==
- List of King's and Queen's Counsel in New Zealand
