= Hopestill Pillow =

Baptist missionary to India

Hopestill Harland Pillow (28 June 1857 – 28 May 1895) was a Baptist missionary to India.

== Early life ==
Pillow was born in 1857 in Lewisham, Kent, England. She was the third child of Thomas Pillow and Ann Aspin.

== New Zealand ==
Pillow emigrated with her family to Christchurch, New Zealand. She attended Oxford Terrace Baptist Church.

== Missionary work and death ==
In 1889, Pillow departed Christchurch to join the Zenana Missions, in Calcutta, India.

The Lyttelton Times records the meeting at Oxford Terrace Baptist Church to mark her departure:

Last evening the Oxford Terrace Baptist schoolroom was well filled with friends assembled to say “farewell” to Miss Hopestill Pillow, on the occasion or her leaving as a missionary in the Zenana work... Mr Carey, on behalf of the Rev Mr Driver, Secretary of the Baptist Missionary Society of New Zealand, proposed the following resolution : —“That we hereby acknowledge our gratitude to Almighty God for having raised up from our midst a messenger to carry the gospel to the women of India, and we desire to convey to our sister. Miss H. H. Pillow, the assurance of continued sympathy with her in the work to which she has been called, and pray that she may be granted a safe voyage, and that good health and abundant blessings may attend her labours as an agent of the New Zealand Baptist Missionary Society.”

After six years in India, Pillow fell ill and died on 28 May 1895 in Calcutta. She is buried in Calcutta.

The Christchurch Press announced her death three months later, in August 1895.

== Legacy ==
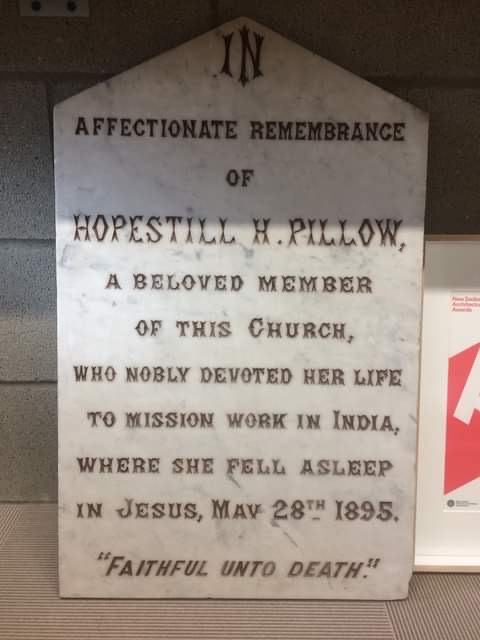
Hopestill Pillow memorial plaque at Oxford Terrace Baptist Church, 2020

In 1896, following Pillow's death, Oxford Terrace Baptist Church erected a stone tablet in Pillow's memory. Following the 2011 Christchurch earthquake and subsequent rebuilding of the church, the porch no longer remains, although the plaque is stored on site.
