= The Insatiable Moon =

2010 film by Rosemary Riddell

- Theatrical release poster
- Directed by: Rosemary Riddell
- Screenplay by: Mike Riddell
- Based on: The Insatiable Moon by Mike Riddell
- Produced by: Pip Piper; Mike Riddell; Rob Taylor
- Starring: Rawiri Paratene; Sara Wiseman; Ian Mune; Greg Johnson
- Cinematography: Thomas Burstyn
- Edited by: Paul Maxwell
- Music by: Neville Copland
- Production companies: Blue Hippo Media; Holy Bucket Productions
- Distributed by: Rialto Distribution
- Release date: 7 October 2010
- Running time: 99 minutes
- Country: New Zealand
- Languages: English; Māori
- Budget: NZ$460,000 (Varies between sources)

The Insatiable Moon is a 2010 New Zealand drama film, based on a 1997 novel of the same name by Mike Riddell, who also wrote the screenplay. The film was directed by Rosemary Riddell, and stars Rawiri Paratene in the leading role as Arthur, self-proclaimed second son of God. Arthur sets off on a mission to find the 'Queen of Heaven', and finds her in Margaret (Sara Wiseman), just as the community boarding house he calls home faces threat.

The film focuses on themes around mental illness and discrimination, and draws on Mike Riddell's experiences working with those with mental health problems and those that are underprivileged. This is what both the novel and screenplay are based on. The film was shot in Ponsonby, a suburb of Auckland.

The film has been screened at Mental Health events, such as Mental Health Awareness Week in 2013.

== Plot ==
Arthur is a Māori man, who sees himself as the second son of God, and works to enlighten those around him. Arthur is considered mentally ill, and lives in a Ponsonby boarding house, operated by the foul-mouthed but hard-working house manager Bob. His friends at the boarding house all have their share of problems, and view Arthur as a role model in many ways.

Arthur wanders the streets, searching for the 'Queen of Heaven', and finds her with community worker Margaret, during a chance encounter at a local cafe. Arthur returns to the boarding house, where the TV series 'Marae Investigates' are filming, and they speak to him as part of a series on boarding houses in the area. Margaret and Arthur meet again at the funeral of one of Arthur's friends, a man with mental problems who commits suicide. Margaret attends in the place of her colleague, who feels guilty as she turned the man away from the community centre because she could not understand him. After the funeral, Arthur invites Margaret back to the boarding house, and introduces her to Bob and the other house residents. Although Margaret is married, she forms a relationship with Arthur.

Health bureaucrats threaten the future of the boarding house, supported by a real estate developer, and so the local Vicar, Kevin, works with Bob and Margaret, who is eager to help, to organise a meeting with local businesses and residents. However, after arguments at the meeting between the opposing sides, no conclusion is decided. Arthur is frustrated at the meeting, and intervenes as the sides argue, eventually being removed by Bob after venting his frustrations at the audience.

Although the boarding house's future is uncertain, Arthur still has faith and buys a lottery ticket, in the hope of winning enough money to support expansions to the house and fix the health problems. However, when the ticket does not win, Arthur becomes withdrawn and is visibly upset and frustrated for several days, and grows distant with Margaret. Norm, a friend of Arthur's and an occasional resident at the house, notices these signs and recommends to Bob that Arthur is taken to a mental hospital, for assessment and help.

Arthur is treated at the hospital, but attempts to escape and so staff are forced to restrain him, inject him with some form of sedative. However, due to the drugs he is already on for his mental health, Arthur loses consciousness and attempts by staff to resuscitate him are unsuccessful.

Bob is angry at the hospital staff and Margaret is devastated by Arthur's death, and a funeral is held for everyone to farewell him. A woman whose daughter was abused by the man who committed suicide earlier in the film approaches Bob, and offers a cheque of $100,000, ensuring the future of the house. The film ends with Arthur sitting on a park bench with Norm, where he hands him a pie and talks to him for a while. Although Norm realises Arthur is not actually there, he is still left holding the pie, as the film ends.

== Cast ==
- Rawiri Paratene as Arthur, second son of God.
- Sara Wiseman as Margaret, a community worker who forms a relationship with Arthur.
- Ian Mune as Norm, a friendly homeless man who is friends with Arthur.
- Greg Johnson as Bob, the manager of the boarding house.
- Jason Hoyte as Kevin, the local Vicar.
- Mick Innes as John, a convicted sex offender with mental problems who Arthur knows.
- Sophie Hakaraia as Karen, a reporter for Marae Investigates.
- Sarah Valentine as Penny, Margaret's colleague at the community centre.
- Don Linden as Wal, a boarding house resident.
- Lee Tuson as Pete, another resident of the boarding house.
- Teresa Woodham as Carolyn, the mother of a girl abused by John.

== Production ==
=== Financing ===
The Insatiable Moon originally had a budget of NZ$6 million, but the New Zealand Film Commission pulled its share of the funding, reducing the production budget to $340,000, and $120,000 for post-production.

=== Casting ===
The film was to star James Nesbitt and Timothy Spall as two of the leads. Their roles were recast when the bulk of the funding was pulled. Mike Riddell's wife Rosemary directed the film, her prior experience primarily in the theatre and one short film.

=== Filming ===
Principal photography took place over five weeks, with another six weeks set for post-production.

=== Music ===
The opening track of the movie, "The Sound", is by Luke Hurley as a busker playing his own song. As well he wrote many riffs for the project and recommended his Dunedin friend Neville Copland to be composer.

== Release and reception ==
=== Critical response ===
The film has a rating of 75% on Rotten Tomatoes, with an average rating of 5.8 as of September 2014. It was mostly well received by critics, with a rating of 4/5 from the New Zealand Herald and 7/10 from TVNZ.

=== Accolades ===
At the 2011 Moondance International Film Festival The Insatiable Moon won the Atlantis Award, for feature films made outside of the US.

At the 2011 Aotearoa Film & Television Awards the film won Best Lead Actor in a feature film (Rawiri Paratene) and Best Supporting Actor in a feature film (Greg Johnson). The film also received nominations for Best Lead Actress(Sara Wiseman), Best Supporting Actress (Teresa Woodham), Best Screenplay (Mike Riddell)and Best Original Music (Neville Copland).
