= John North (theologian) =

New Zealand Baptist minister, editor (1871–1950)

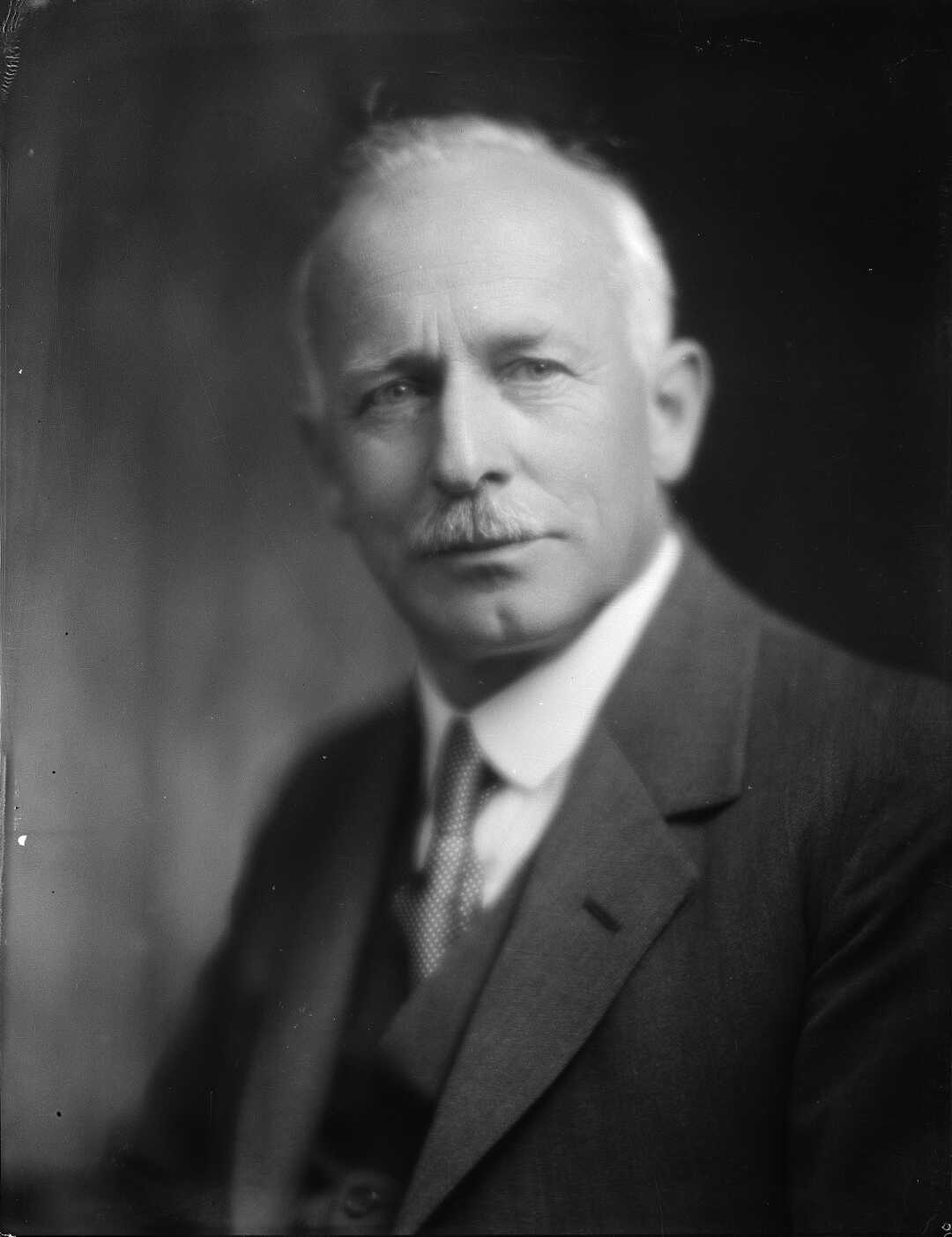
North in 1932

John James North OBE (26 July 1871 – 14 July 1950) was a New Zealand Baptist minister, editor and the first principal of the New Zealand Baptist Theological College. He was born in Dukinfield, Cheshire, England, in 1871.

He was appointed an Officer of the Order of the British Empire in the 1950 New Year Honours "for services to the Baptist organisation in New Zealand". His son Alfred was a lawyer and judge.
