= Carey Baptist College =

College in Auckland, New Zealand

- Te Kāreti Iriiri o Carey
- Former name: New Zealand Baptist Theological College
- Type: Private college
- Established: 1924
- Affiliations: Baptist Churches of New Zealand
- Academic affiliations: New Zealand Qualifications Authority
- Principal: Dr. Paul Jones
- Academic staff: 12 full-time 21 part-time
- Students: 329
- Location: 1-7 Marewa Road, Greenlane, Auckland, Greenlane, Auckland, New Zealand; 36.889°S 174.795°E
- Campus: Suburban
- Colours: Orange, White, and Grey
- Website: carey.ac.nz

Carey Baptist College is a Baptist Bible and theological college in Auckland, New Zealand. It is affiliated with the Baptist Churches of New Zealand.

== History ==
The college was founded in 1924 as New Zealand Baptist Theological College. It held its first classes in 1926, originally training men to be ministers for Baptist churches in New Zealand. Its first principal was J.J. North.

The college was renamed in 1992 to Carey Baptist College after the English Baptist missionary William Carey.
