= Queen Street, Auckland =

Street in Auckland, New Zealand

Queen Street
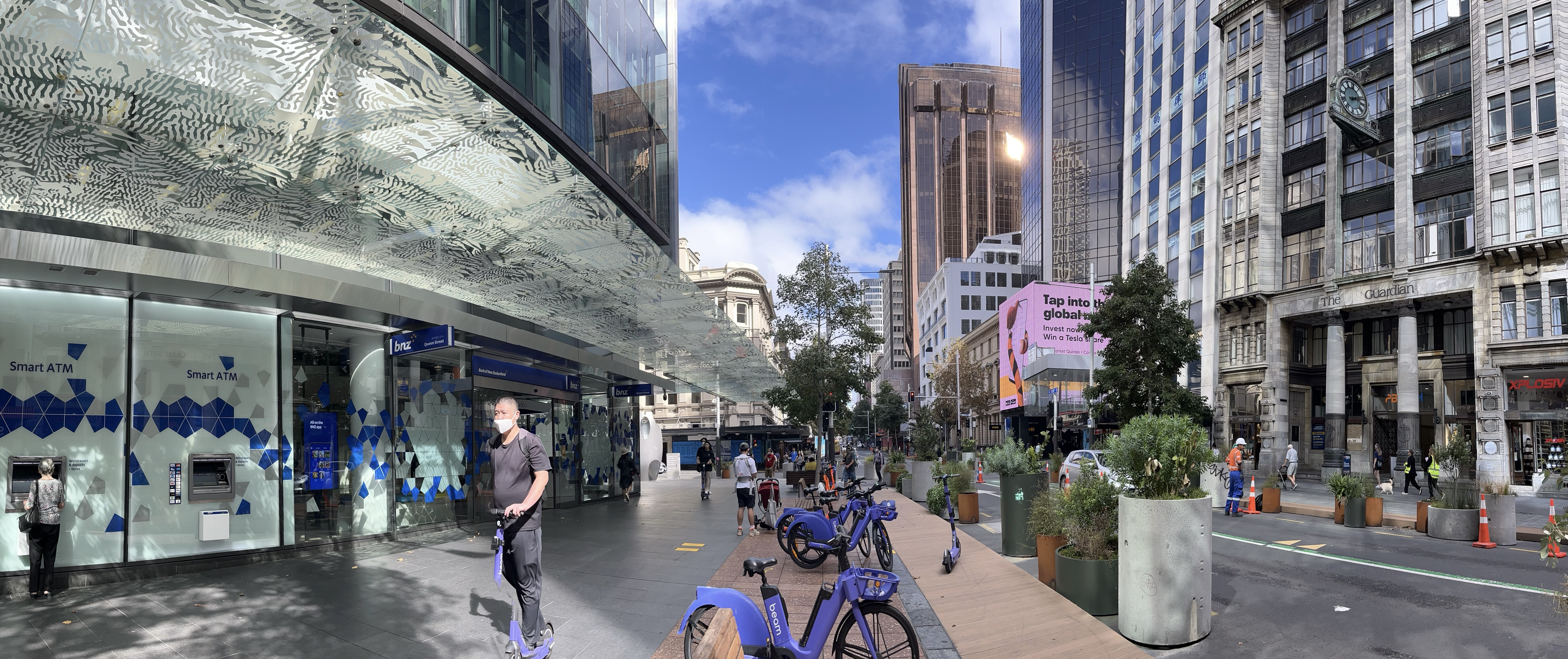
- View of Queen Street looking south from Fort Street, 2022
- Interactive map of Queen Street
- Length: 1.7 km (1.1 mi); Including pedestrianised section
- Location: Auckland CBD, New Zealand
- Postal code: 1010
- Nearest metro station: Waitematā station, Te Waihorotiu station
- Coordinates: 36°51′00″S 174°45′54″E
- North end: Customs Street
- South end: Karangahape Road

Queen Street is the major commercial thoroughfare in the Auckland CBD, Auckland, New Zealand's largest city. The northern end is at Te Komititanga square on the Auckland waterfront, adjacent to Waitematā railway station and Commercial Bay Shopping Centre. The road is close to straight, the southern end being almost three kilometres away in a south-southwesterly direction on the Karangahape Road ridge, close to the residential suburbs in the interior of the Auckland isthmus.

== Geography ==
Named after Queen Victoria, Queen Street was an early development of the new town of Auckland (founded in 1840), although initially the main street was intended to be Shortland Street, running parallel to the shore of Commercial Bay. The early route of Queen Street led up the middle of a gully following the bank of the Waihorotiu Stream (later bounded in as the 'Ligar Canal'). This canal was culverted beneath the street from the 1870s onward, allowing for further development of the street to be undertaken. The course of the stream is still reflected today in the slight bend of lower Queen Street. From north of Shortland Street, Queen Street is built on land reclaimed from the sea in the late 19th century (see Auckland waterfront article).

There are several other 'Queen Streets' in the greater Auckland area, mostly in suburbs that were separate towns before being absorbed by a growing central city. Auckland was also called the "Queen City" since before the turn of the 20th century, though that term is now overshadowed by the nickname "City of Sails".

== History ==
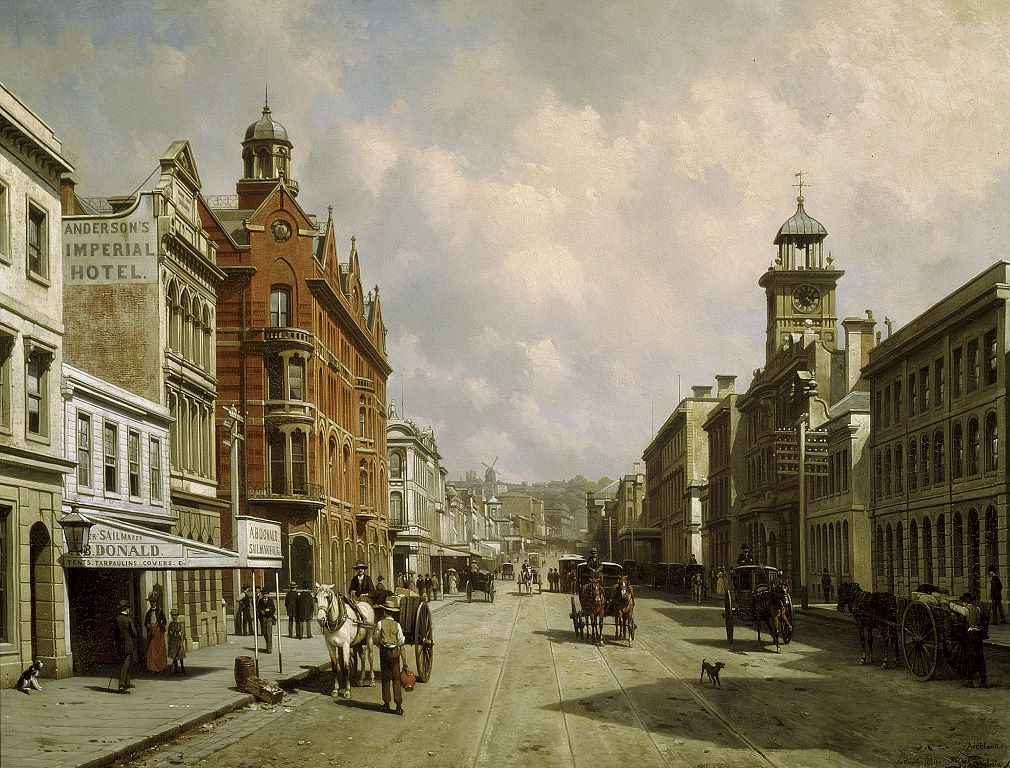
Queen Street (c.1889); painting by Jacques Carabain

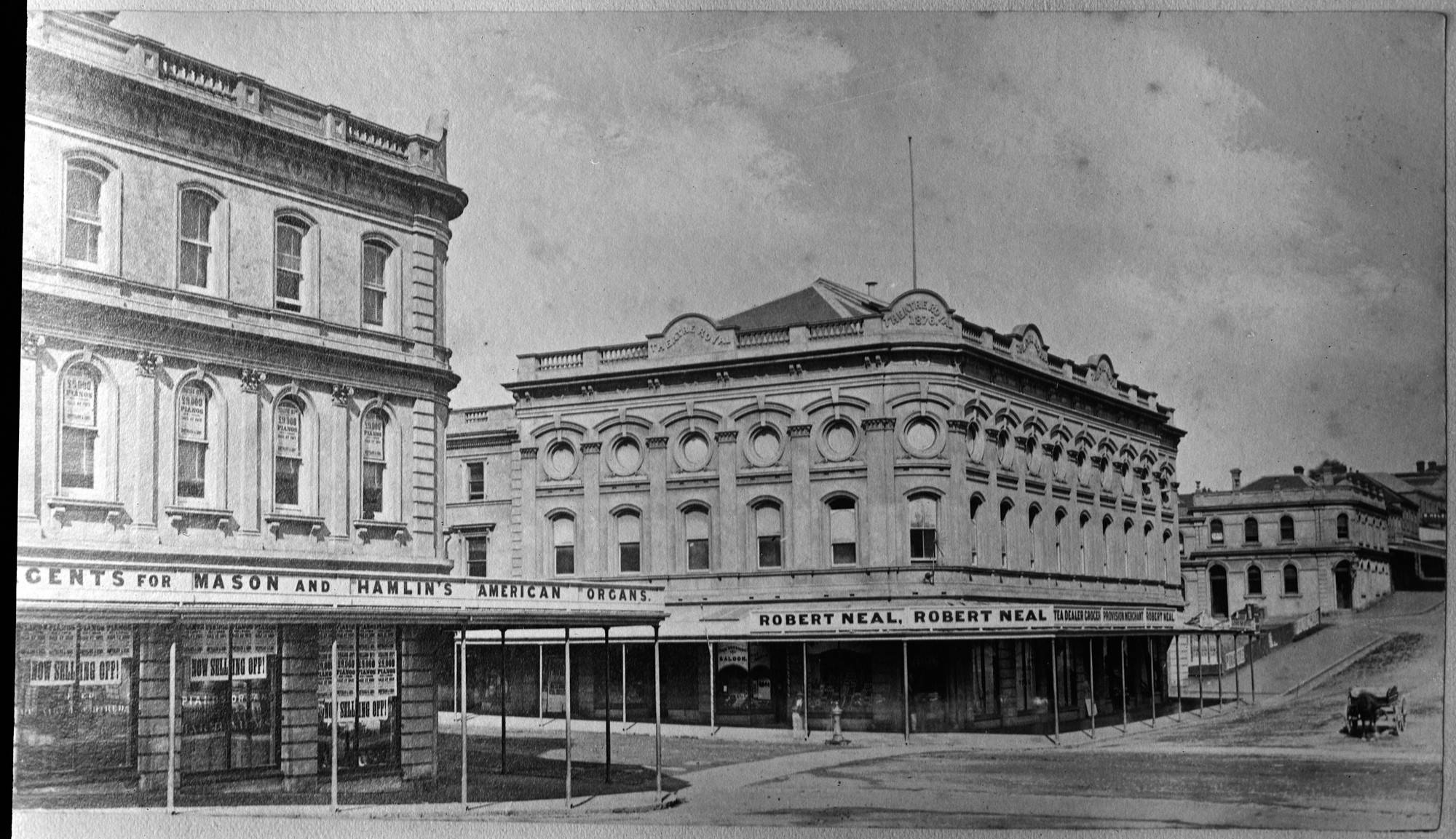
Looking from Victoria Street East (1880s) across Queen Street (left to right centre) along the south side of Victoria Street West (right)

=== Street, stream and canal ===
The valley in which Queen Street is situated was formed by Te Wai Horotiu (The water of Horotiu) or Waihorotiu Stream. Māori lived along the stream and used it as a food source and for other purposes. It ran from the ridge along Karagahape Road towards the sea. Horotiu is the name of a taniwha (guardian spirit) which was believed to live in the stream. In 1841 colonial settlers built a number of wooden buildings along the western side, following the general path of the Waihorotiu Stream according to the plans set out by surveyor Felton Mathew. While the street was metalled in 1843, the natural stream still often overflowed its banks, and the area was still swampy. This led to canalisation and later covering-over of the stream.

=== Mainstreet of Auckland ===
After a fire in 1858 destroyed around 50 buildings in High Street and Shortland Street, the commercial district began to shift towards Queen Street instead, and the first brick and plaster buildings of the 1860s started to cement this move, with the Bank of New Zealand building (only the façade extant today) being one of the first examples. Fires however still continued to plague the new town, with one in 1873 wiping out another 54 buildings in the Queen Street area between Wellesley Street West and Grey Street (today Greys Avenue). The fires, amongst other things, led to the establishment of the Auckland Volunteer Fire Service.

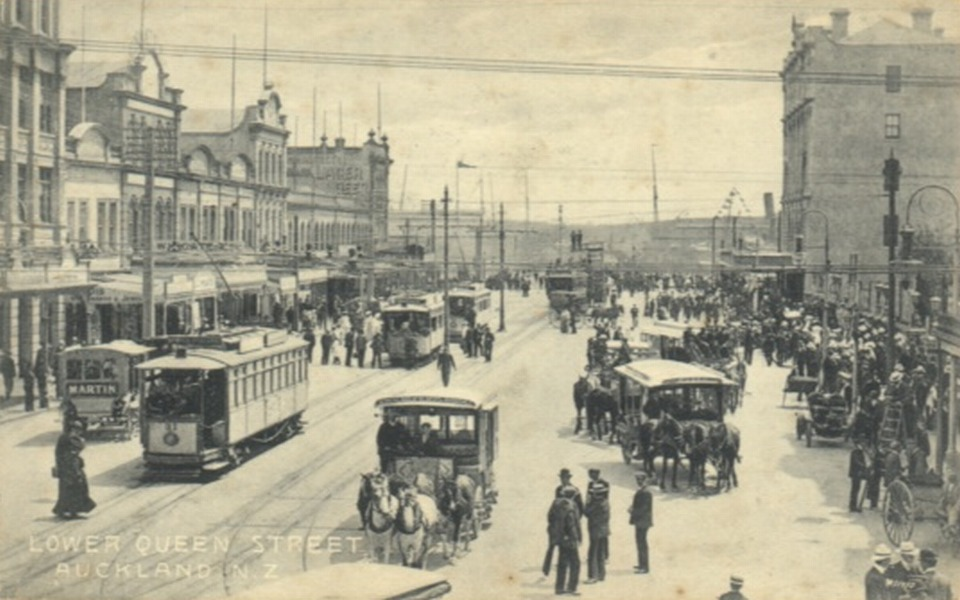
Lower Queen Street in 1919, with trams, cars and horse-drawn cabs visible.

In the 1880s, the first horse-drawn buses began connecting Queen Street with areas such as Ponsonby Road and Remuera. In 1900, the first motorcar was admired on the street, and in 1902 the street was finally asphalted, the first street in New Zealand. The same year the first electric trams also arrived, to provide services until 1956.

The late 19th and early 20th centuries saw a large number of imposing buildings constructed, such as the Smith & Caughey's building, the Auckland Town Hall and the General Post Office at the waterfront, later to become the Britomart Transport Centre. By that time, the street was popular for events such as parades and festivities, as well as for political activities such as the strike demonstrations of 1913. Queen Street riots occurred after a 1932 unemployment march and broke out again in the adjacent Aotea Square in late 1984. During the second half of the 20th century, many of the older buildings on Queen Street were demolished to make space for larger office buildings.

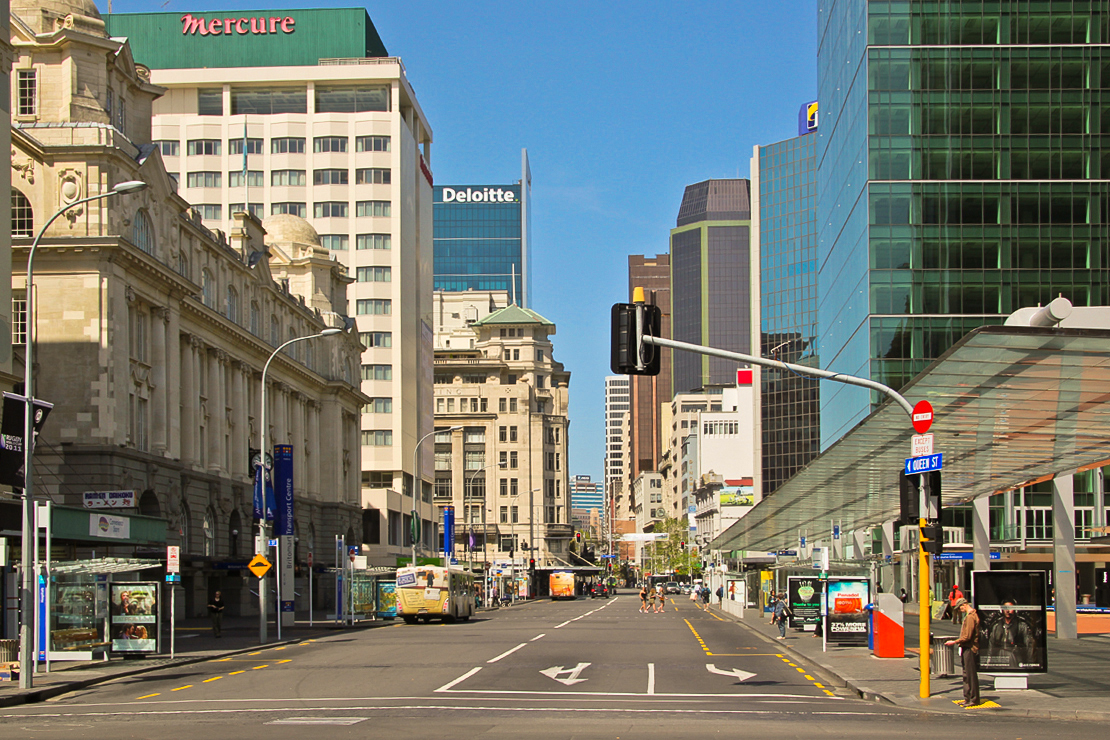
Pre-2016 view of Queen Street looking towards downtown Auckland, from in front of the Downtown Ferry Terminal

== Character ==
Queen Street gives its name to the most expensive square in the New Zealand version of Monopoly and to describe business people with rural investment interests (but lacking farming expertise): 'Queen Street farmers'. The street was immortalised by The Front Lawn with their song (It started on) Queen Street.

The street has been the site of numerous parades, marches and other events of political, cultural or sporting nature. Together with adjacent High Street, it is the main retail precinct of the central city, with most national store, bank and restaurant franchises having a branch on the street. Several important other local businesses, such as the Smith & Caughey's department store, have flagship branches here.

The street sees very high pedestrian numbers, estimated by some as up to 10 times as high as on Broadway in Newmarket, seen as Queen Street's closest shopping street rival in Auckland.

== Transport and foot traffic ==
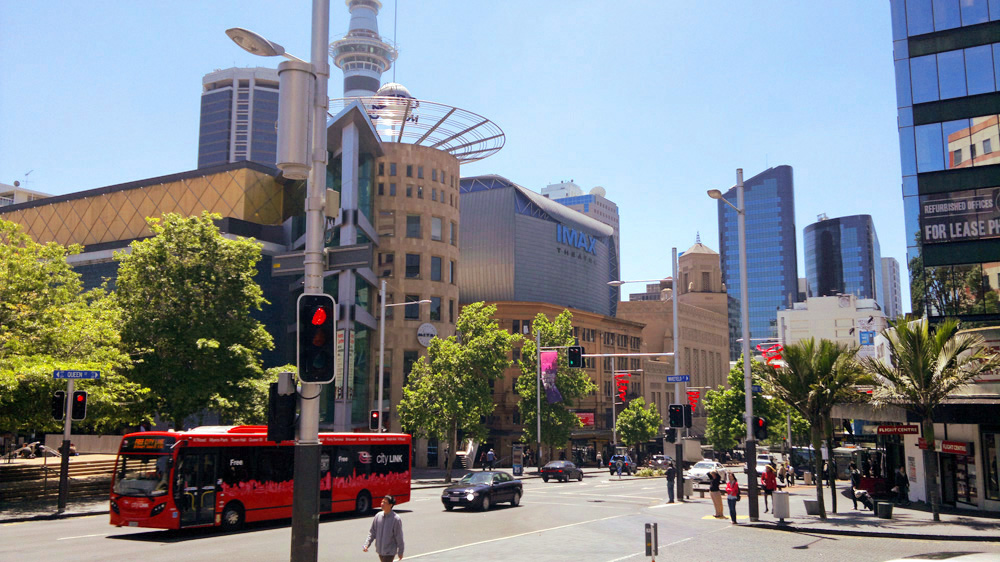
Queen Street by Aotea Square. The SkyCity Village Cinemas is visible in the background.

Prior to a 2006–2008 street upgrade (see below), Council figures showed that over 50,000 pedestrians, 40,000 public transport users and 20,000 people in private vehicles used Queen Street daily. The Council anticipated that the private car share would drop by around 15%. An editorial of The New Zealand Herald accused Council of using overestimated public transport user numbers for political purposes to support its bus lane plans.

=== Former tram network ===
Until December 1956, trams provided public transport along Queen Street, and it was the only street in New Zealand with grand unions, double-track to double-track junctions, where trams could go to all directions from all directions. These junctions were at the intersections with Customs Street and Wellesley Street. Since the closure of Auckland's tram network, Balaclava Junction on Melbourne's tram network has been the sole grand union left in the Southern Hemisphere.

== 2006–2008 upgrade ==
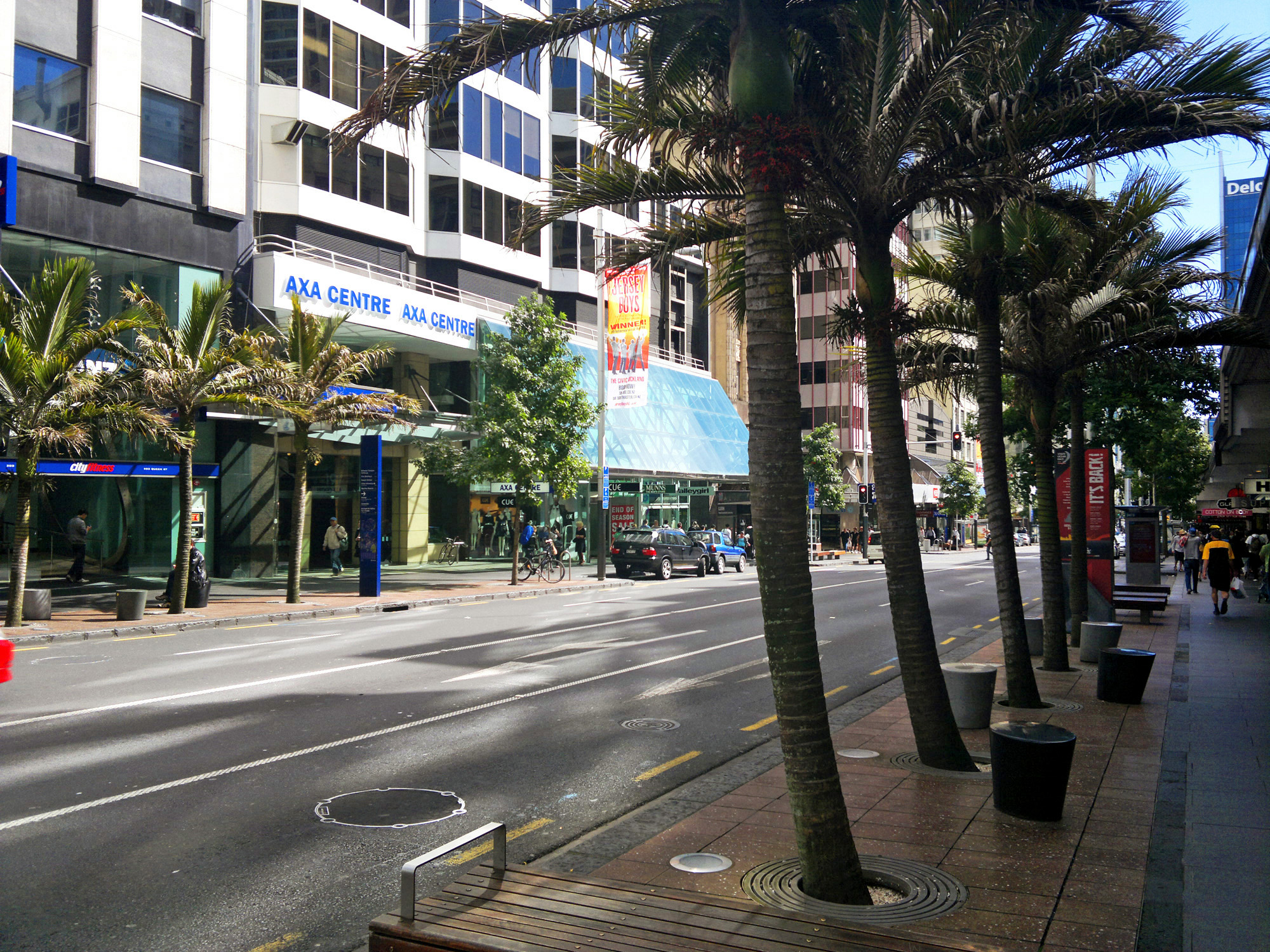
A section of Queen Street following the 2006–2008 upgrade

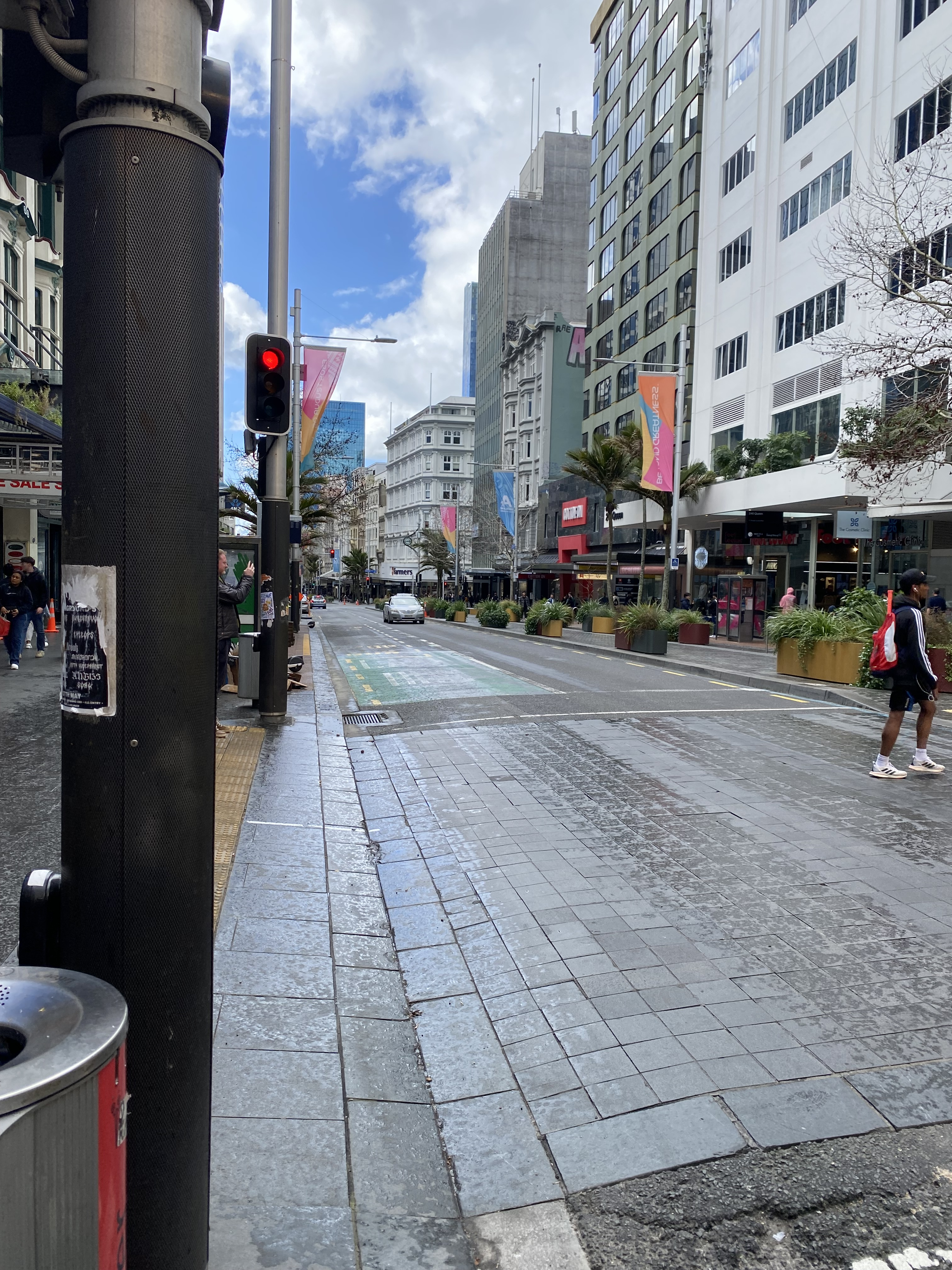
Queen Street after a further upgrade in 2023

Public perception in the early 2000s was that Queen Street had lost some of its good reputation in the previous decades, with a rundown and uncoordinated streetscape and the loss of several prestigious retailers cited as either causes or effects. Auckland City Council decided to address the issue of the 'tired' Queen Street through a major redevelopment of the street.

This involved the widening and relaying of footpaths with basalt kerbstones and paving. Granite insets, designed in consultation with the local Māori (Ngati Whatua iwi), as well as recycled redchip pavers from the existing footpath, were used to denote special areas – such as those related to the existence of the old Waihorotiu Stream. New street furniture (such as multi-purpose poles for lighting, signage and pennants) and new trees and other landscaping were added to create a 'boulevard effect'. The liquidambars and Nīkau Palms chosen for the new design touched off heated public discussion in 2006 as their inclusion came at the destruction of previous, established trees (which were not native flora of New Zealand, and thus not retained in the new landscaping plan).

The 2006–2008 project repeatedly increased in cost, from NZ$23 million to around NZ$43.5 million, with some aspects (such as an improved entrance to Myers Park) falling victim to the blowout. While Council noted in June 2007 that progress had often been quicker than expected, the cost overruns, and the long duration of the construction works – which substantially affected pedestrian and motor vehicle traffic as well as retail sales – made the upgrade unpopular in public, at least during the duration. It also became a problem issue for Dick Hubbard in his failed campaign for re-election to Mayor of Auckland in 2007. The upgrade is now considered to have generally been a success, and it won the 2009 Urban Design Award of the New Zealand Institute of Architects, which commended it for creating a quality public realm and sense of place.

=== Upgrade priorities ===
To accommodate construction work, Auckland City Council reduced traffic lanes for vehicles to one lane in each direction in early 2007. A proposal was made for this to become permanent, with extended public transport provisions such as bus lanes and cycle lanes proposed for the outer lanes. Also proposed was a 30 km/h speed limit. Committee discussions and public consultation resulted in four physical lanes being retained, mainly to safeguard the street layout for future public transport options such as light rail.

The changes included further improvements to pedestrian facilities, with the total footpath area increasing by 20% to almost 14,000 m^{2}, and longer traffic signal phases for pedestrians, while three new signalised pedestrian crossings were introduced mid-block, at accident 'black spots'. Also undertaken was a reduction of on-street parking spaces from 81 to 51, part of the prioritisation for pedestrians. The remaining spaces became dedicated short-term parking (i.e. drop-offs, loading). Not included in the design were dedicated bus bays, noted as a serious oversight by some critics, causing potential delays on the proposed bus lanes.

== Shooting ==
On 20 July 2023, a mass shooting involving a construction site on the northern end of Queen Street occurred, resulting in the deaths of three people, including the shooter.

== Buildings and attractions ==
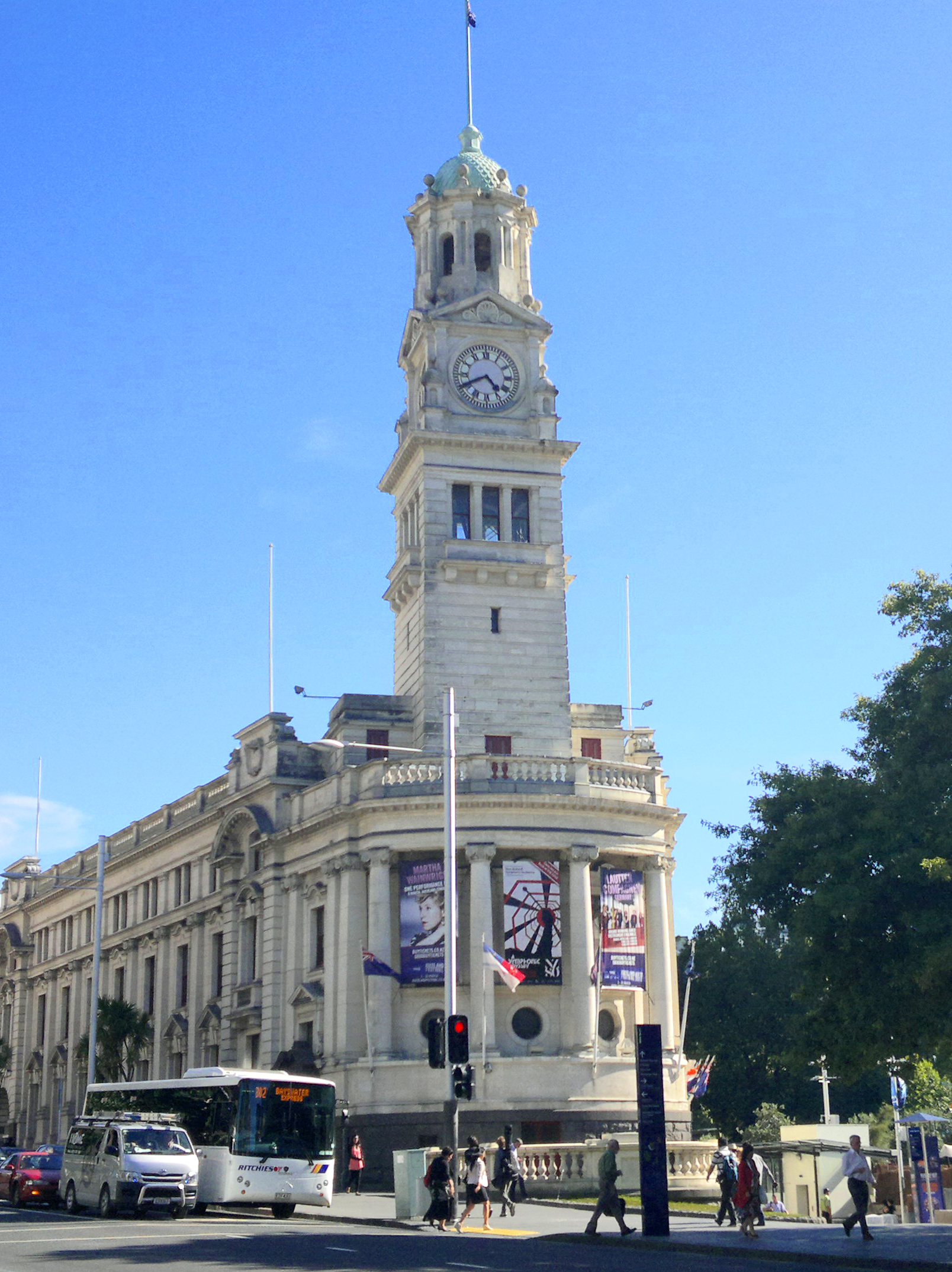
Auckland Town Hall, a major civic building of the early 20th century.

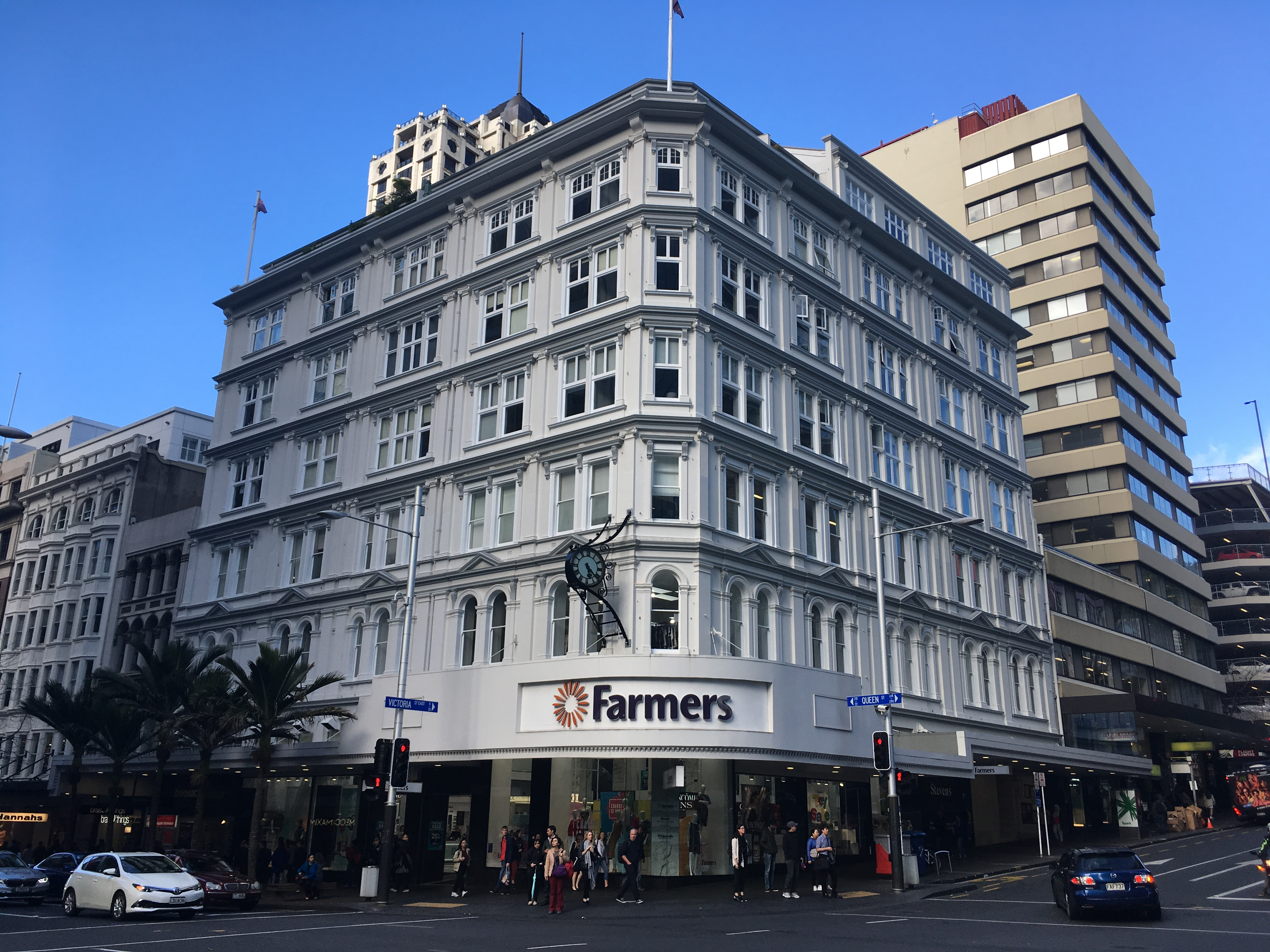
The Farmers Trading Company premises, looking up from the corner of Queen Street and Victoria Street.

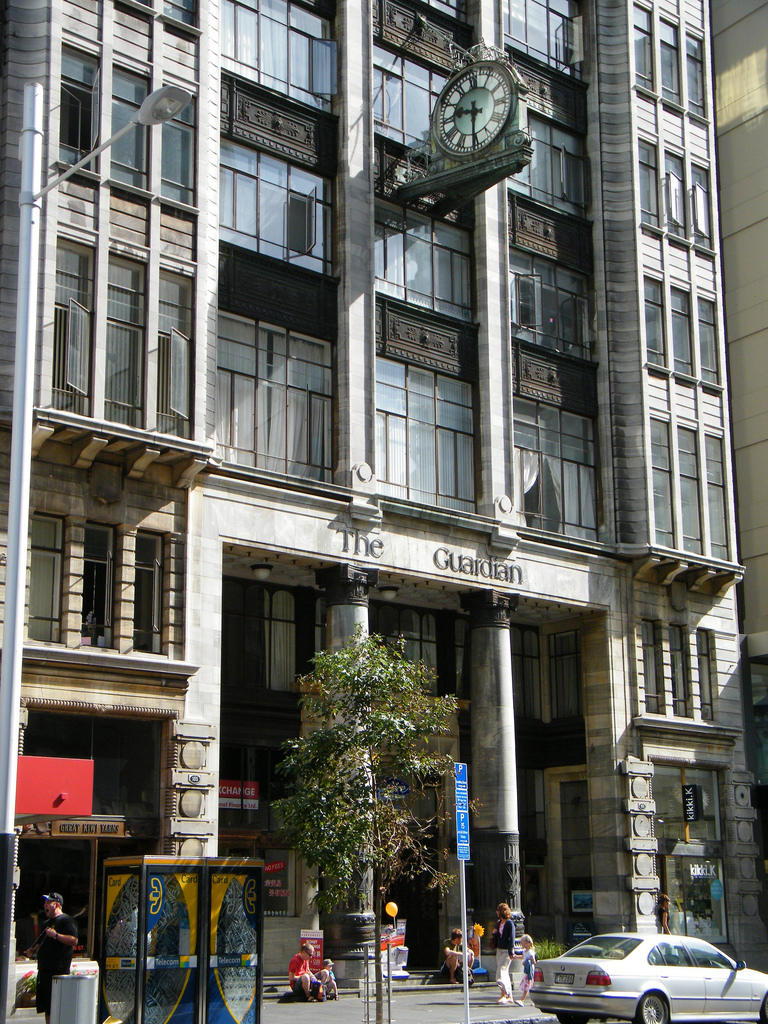
The Guardian building, one of the heritage office buildings on the street, recently converted to apartments.

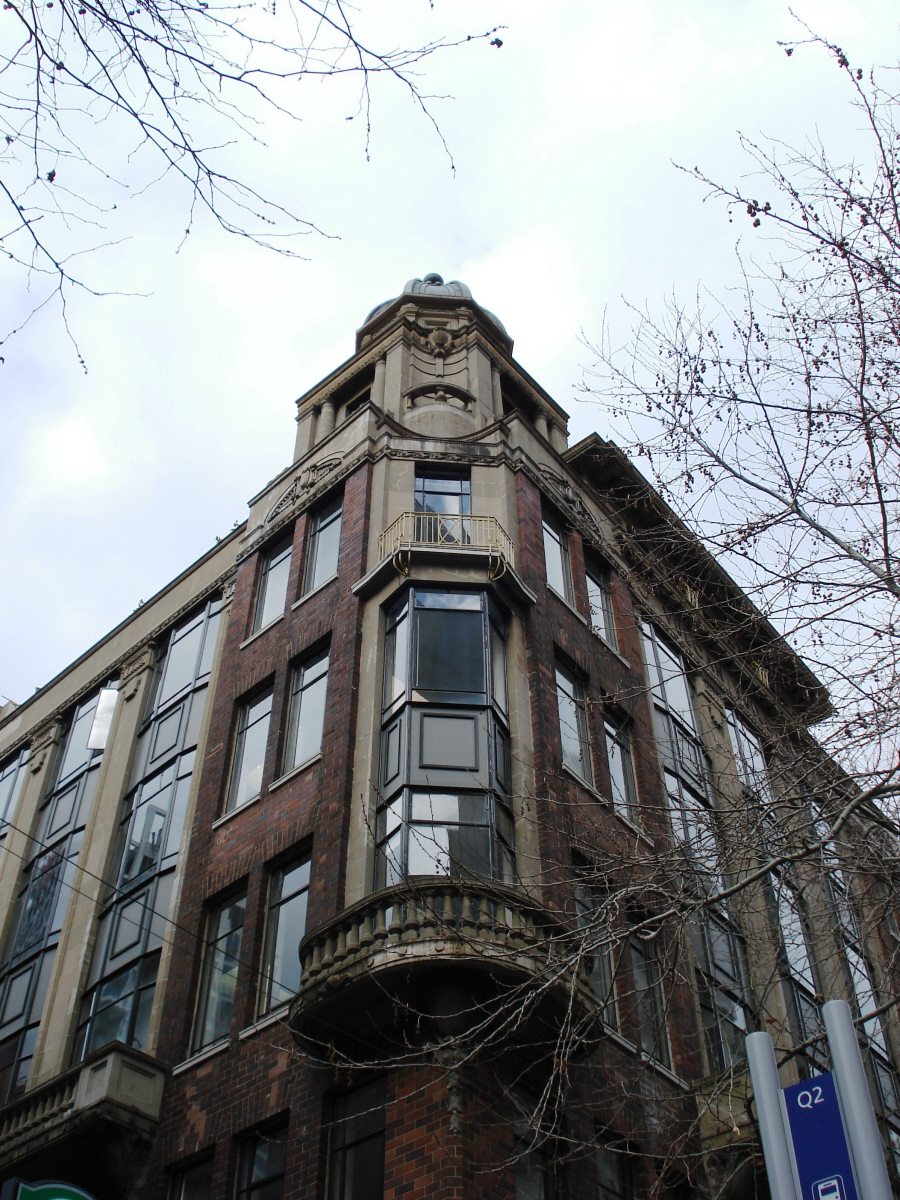
Vulcan Buildings, looking up from the corner of Queen Street and Vulcan Lane.

At the northern (waterfront) end of Queen Street are several significant buildings. These include:

- Auckland Ferry Building, 1911. Alex Wiseman architect. This brick and sandstone building is in the Edwardian Baroque style. It was renovated in 1986 at a cost of $11 million.
- Endeans Building, 1914–15. Corner of Queen Street and Quay Street. Built by John Endean, a prominent hotel proprietor, in 1905 and rebuilt 10 years later after a fire. Chilwell and Trevithick architects. The upper floors of this reinforced concrete building were converted to apartments during the 1990s. Listed as a Category II heritage building.
- (Former) Chief Post Office, 1910. John Campbell architect. Opened by Prime Minister William Massey before a crowd of over 8,000. This Edwardian Baroque building of limestone and granite has been incorporated into the Britomart Transport Centre. Campbell was the Government Architect, and consequently this building has similar features to the New Zealand Parliament Buildings in Wellington, which were constructed around the same time.
- (Former) Custom House, 1888. Thomas Mahoney architect, 22 Customs St. This building displays the mansard roofs typical of the French Second Empire Style. In 1909 an addition was built to the south [now demolished]. Prior to the Town Hall's opening in 1911 several departments of the Auckland City Council were located here. The Custom House was renovated for retail use in the 1980s.
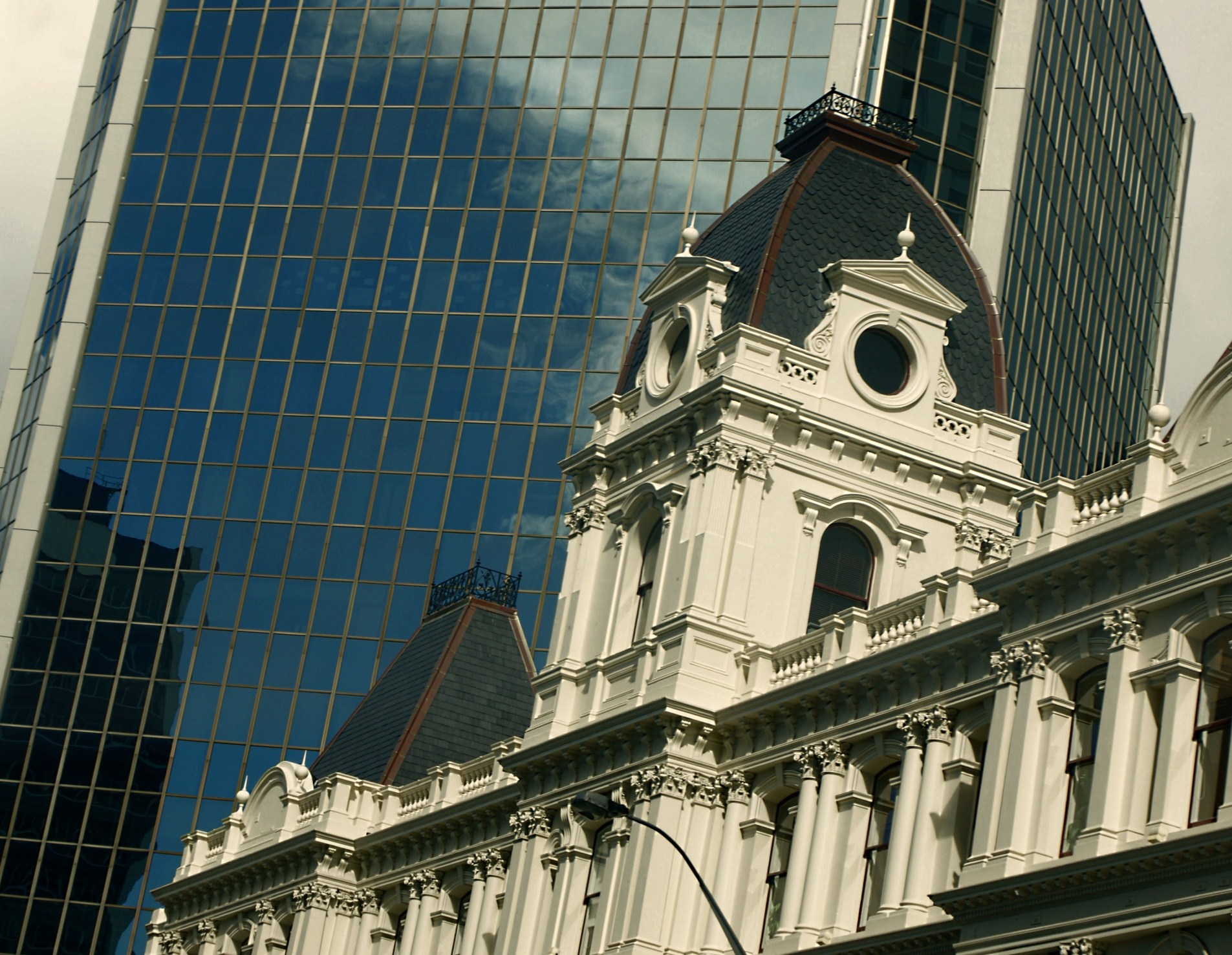
  The old Auckland Customhouse, c.1889

Between Customs Street and Wellesley Street, Queen Street is lined with retail and office buildings. This section of the street is where the majority of the high-rise buildings are located. These are mostly 20th century in origin, although a number of 19th-century structures survive. Many large corporations, insurance companies and banks had substantial buildings on Queen Street and in some cases their head offices were located here rather than in Wellington (the capital). The most significant buildings along the middle part of the street are the:

- Dilworth Building, 1927. Gummer and Ford architects. 22 Queen St. Envisaged as one of a pair of buildings flanking the entrance to Queen Street and thus being a "Gateway to Auckland". The use of electric cranes rather than hydraulic meant a very short construction period. The Dilworth Building is a reinforced concrete structure encased in Portland stone. William Gummer had been trained in the offices of Sir Edwin Lutyens, and this building shows influence of this connection.
- The Queens Arcade – 34 Queen Street. 1920s Neo-classical building linking the eastern side of Queen Street with Customs Street.
- Imperial Hotel – 66 Queen Street. A Victorian building from 1883 that is now used as a backpackers, the Imperial Hotel incorporated a building that had previously been offices for the Auckland Harbour Board and the Gas Board.
- Guardian Trust Building – 105 Queen Street. A 1919 reinforced concrete structure distinguished by bronze entrance columns. The architect William Gummer had been trained in the offices of Sir Edwin Lutyens, and this building shows influence of this connection. The stone used on the Queen Street façade and in the lobby is Cloudy Bay Marble from Nelson.
- 80 Queen Street. New tower designed by Woods Bagot Architects which incorporates the Jean Batten State Building.
- Jean Batten State Building – Named after the pioneer New Zealand aviator Jean Batten. Designed by John Mair, government architect in 1937 and completed in 1940. This was intended as office space for Government departments in Auckland which had outgrown their premises in the Custom House in nearby Customs Street. The building was used by the American High Command as their headquarters for the duration of the Second World War.
- South British Insurance Building – 15 Shortland Street. 1927 building by R F Draffin for the South British Insurance Company – the lobby is arguably the best Art-Deco interior in Auckland. The addition to the east dates from 1968 and is on the site of a Victorian Pub.
- General Building – 33 Shortland Street. Neo-Classical skyscraper built for the Yorkshire Insurance Company. Designed by W R Bloomfield in 1928. Bloomfield was probably the first Maori architect. The Shortland Street facade of this building was extended in 1977. Few people looking at the building would be aware that the right hand {western} side of the building is from 1928 and the left hand {eastern} from 1977 as the classical detailing was perfectly replicated.
- Bank of New Zealand Building, 1865. Leonard Terry architect. 125 Queen St. Built of beige sandstone imported from Hobart, Australia, this building was originally only five bays wide, and in 1882 two more bays were added on the Queen Street facade. In 1986 this building was substantially altered, and now only the facade remains, attached to a large high rise office building.
- Vulcan Buildings, 1928. Holman, Moses & Watkins architects. This elegant building stands prominently on the southern corner of Vulcan Lane and Queen Street, and has design influences principally from Neoclassical architecture, but also the English Arts and Crafts movement. A defining feature is the cupola on the top of the building. The building also marks a significant change in built form of Central Auckland, as the city was being transformed from the low-rise buildings of the 19th century to the high-rise buildings of the 20th century.
- Landmark House, formerly Auckland Electric Power Board Building 1927. Wade & Bartley architects. Cnr Queen St and Durham St east. This is an example of the early Art Deco – gothic skyscraper style. The design emphasises the vertical, drawing on references from Chicago and New York skyscrapers of the period. The Auckland Electric Power Board used the building as a form of advertising by flood lighting the exterior.
- Queen Victoria Building, Auckland, formerly John Courts Building. Designed by John Currie in 1899 for the Direct Supply Company. Cnr Queen St and Victoria St East. The first three stories are in the Victorian Italianate style. Internally the building retains its timber columns and floor structure. In 1910 John Court opened his department store in the building and in 1916 added three stories in the same style.
- AMP Building – 220 Queen Street. 1962 Modernist New York Style Skyscraper. This building is an example of a Glass curtain wall and is distinguished by crisp metal detailing. Designed by Jack Manning for Thorp Cutter Pickmere & Douglas Architects.
- Strand Arcade 233–237 Queen St. Commissioned by local businessman Arthur Myers, built in 1900 with the latest in lifts, ventilation and lighting (the basement restaurant could seat 700). The architect was Arthur Pollard Wilson (who also designed Naval and Family Hotel, Arthur H Nathan Warehouse, Northern Steam Ship Company Building and Isaacs’ Bonded Stores) Renovated in 1970 this Edwardian shopping arcade has remained largely unaltered.
- Auckland Savings Bank Building, 1884. Edward Bartley architect. 260 Queen St. This is an example of the mid Victorian italianate style. The facade displays columns and panels of coloured marble and granite. In 1977 this building became a McDonald's restaurant, although the facade and interior remain largely intact due to a sensitive renovation.

Beyond the Wellesley Street intersection lies the midtown district, with its entertainment and civic focus, centred on Aotea Square. Here are located most of the important civic buildings, including the:

- Auckland Civic Theatre, 1929. Bohringer, Taylor & Johnson architects. 269 Queen St. This is one of the best remaining examples of an atmospheric theatre. The monumental Art Deco stripped-classical facade hides a lavish Hollywood inspired interior. The lobby is a reproduction of an Indian rock temple decorated with 500 elephants. The auditorium is decorated as an open courtyard in ancient Baghdad, the ceiling imitating the night sky with hundreds of electric stars placed as they appear in the southern sky. Extensively renovated in 1994 it is now part of a larger entertainment and retail complex. The renovation fixed several problems including the undersized stage and inadequate backstage facilities.
- St. James Theatre – 316 Queen Street. 1927 theatre building in the 1920s Hollywood/Spanish style designed for vaudeville but wired for talking pictures in 1929. The stage capacity, acoustics and seating sightlines meant this theatre was superior to the other venues of the period (His Majesty's, King's Theatre, and the Auckland Opera House); even after the appearance of the Civic it still stood out as the best venue for traditional live theatre. The landmark turret above the Queen street entrance is possibly still concealed behind modernist cladding.
- Bledisloe House, 1959. A modernist glass facade office block designed for Central Government services as part of the proposed Civic Centre. Designed by Gordon Wilson with Jack Beere and named after Lord Bledisloe (Governor-General of New Zealand from 1930 to 1935). This was the only one of a complex of six identical buildings planned for the environs of what is now Aotea Square. The other five buildings were to be the new Town Hall, a City Administration block, a new Public Library, public Art Gallery and a final office block to be rented out as commercial office space. In the middle of this complex was to be the Auckland Centennial Theatre and a public square. The Admin Bldg was eventually built in 1966 in a different form and the theatre appeared in 1989 as the Aotea Centre. The other four buildings would have required the demolition of all the other buildings on this city block including the 1911 Town Hall and the Civic Theatre. The Bledisloe Building was renovated in 2014 by Auckland Council.
- Aotea Centre, 1990. Ewen Wainscott architect. Initially proposed in 1949 as the Auckland Centennial Hall, construction of this building was delayed for several decades. Intended to supplant the town hall, when it opened it was found to have acoustical problems resulting in a costly refit. Complaints from performers over many years resulted in the renovation of the Town Hall. The lobby of the Aotea Centre contains many art works by New Zealand artists.
- Council Administration Block, 1966. Tibor K.Donner architect. Considered a positive example of 1950s modernism, which contrasts with the 1911 Town Hall on the far side of Aotea Square. Is considered to be Auckland's first 'skyscraper'.
- Auckland Town Hall, 1911. J. Clark & Sons architects. 303 Queen St. A Melbourne firm designed this building in the English Baroque style. It is built of Melbourne Bluestone and Oamaru stone with art nouveau leadlight windows. The main auditorium has excellent acoustics being based upon the famous Gewandhaus Concert Hall in Leipzig, Germany. The large pipe organ was donated by Sir Henry Brett, a former mayor of Auckland. This building was renovated in the late 1990s and continues to be widely considered as Auckland's premier concert venue.

Further up Queen Street beyond Mayoral Drive is the uptown district, centred on Myers Park. This is often referred to as Upper Queen Street, although that name actually refers to a separate continuation of Queen Street on the other side of the K'Road ridge. The most significant buildings in this area are the:

- 'Queen Street Shops' – 456–488 Queen Street. Range of Edwardian retail buildings from 1909 onwards. Designed by two Auckland architects, T W May and Alex Wiseman. These form a harmonious ensemble facing Myers Park but also retain many original features often removed from other structures; the curved corrugated iron verandahs are intact and held up by vertical posts, and virtually all the shops' fronts are intact including the glazed tile work surrounds.
- Theosophical Society Building, 1923. Henry Robinson architect. Located at the Queen St entrance to Myers Park, this is a fine example of interwar neo-classical architecture for the Theosophical Society replacing an earlier structure from 1912 located further down Queen Street. Recently renovated as a 'gentlemen's club' called 'The White House'.
- Myers Free Kindergarten 1916 B.Chilwell & R.Trevithick architects. Designed as a large homely cottage this brick and stucco building is located in the middle of the 1914 Myers Park. An example of Arts & Crafts architecture which still operates as a kindergarten.
- Auckland Baptist Tabernacle 1884 Edmund Bell architect. Near the corner of Queen St & Karangahape Road. Large Imperial Roman temple. The interior has decorative ceiling stencilwork in the neo-classical style by Samuel and Charles Blomfield.

Beyond the Karangahape Road ridge the southernmost 500 metres of the street is called Upper Queen Street, and it crosses the eastern part of the Central Motorway Junction, the largest interchange on the New Zealand state highway network.

== Demographics ==
The statistical areas of Queen Street, which encompasses a full block either side of Queen Street north of Wellesley Street, and Queen Street South West, which includes the area west of Queen Street to Vincent Street and Pitt Street south of Wellesley Street, cover 0.40 km^{2} (0.15 sq mi) and had an estimated population of 4,250 as of June 2025, with a population density of 10,625 people per km^{2}.

Historical population
Year	Pop.	±% p.a.
2006	2,280	—
2013	3,168	+4.81%
2018	3,807	+3.74%
2023	3,621	−1.00%

Queen Street had a population of 3,621 in the 2023 New Zealand census, a decrease of 186 people (−4.9%) since the 2018 census, and an increase of 453 people (14.3%) since the 2013 census. There were 1,827 males, 1,725 females and 63 people of other genders in 2,199 dwellings. 13.3% of people identified as LGBTIQ+. There were 135 people (3.7%) aged under 15 years, 1,467 (40.5%) aged 15 to 29, 1,743 (48.1%) aged 30 to 64, and 276 (7.6%) aged 65 or older.

People could identify as more than one ethnicity. The results were 42.8% European (Pākehā); 8.4% Māori; 4.8% Pasifika; 44.6% Asian; 7.6% Middle Eastern, Latin American and African New Zealanders (MELAA); and 1.8% other, which includes people giving their ethnicity as "New Zealander". English was spoken by 94.8%, Māori language by 2.2%, Samoan by 1.0%, and other languages by 44.7%. No language could be spoken by 1.0% (e.g. too young to talk). New Zealand Sign Language was known by 0.3%. The percentage of people born overseas was 64.3, compared with 28.8% nationally.

Religious affiliations were 23.9% Christian, 6.9% Hindu, 3.0% Islam, 0.7% Māori religious beliefs, 2.9% Buddhist, 0.7% New Age, 0.2% Jewish, and 2.4% other religions. People who answered that they had no religion were 53.6%, and 6.0% of people did not answer the census question.

Of those at least 15 years old, 1,590 (45.6%) people had a bachelor's or higher degree, 1,131 (32.4%) had a post-high school certificate or diploma, and 774 (22.2%) people exclusively held high school qualifications. 471 people (13.5%) earned over $100,000 compared to 12.1% nationally. The employment status of those at least 15 was that 1,914 (54.9%) people were employed full-time, 471 (13.5%) were part-time, and 180 (5.2%) were unemployed.

Individual statistical areas
Name	Area (km^{2})	Population	Density (per km^{2})	Dwellings	Median age	Median income
Queen Street	0.17	1,617	9,512	1,002	33.1 years	$47,100
Queen Street South West	0.23	2,004	8,713	1,197	30.5 years	$38,500
New Zealand					38.1 years	$41,500

== Image gallery ==
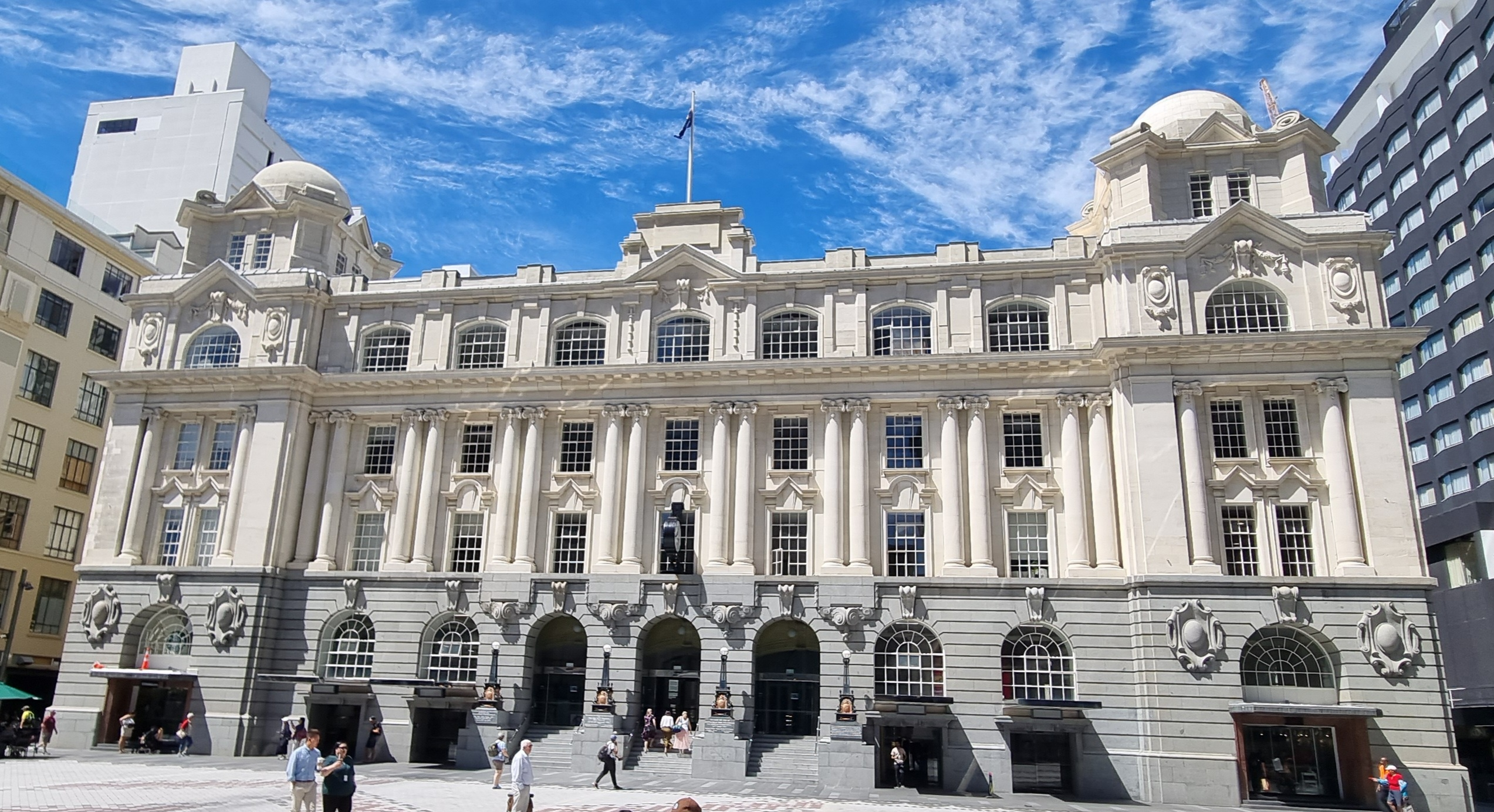
The Old Auckland Chief Post Office,
now Britomart

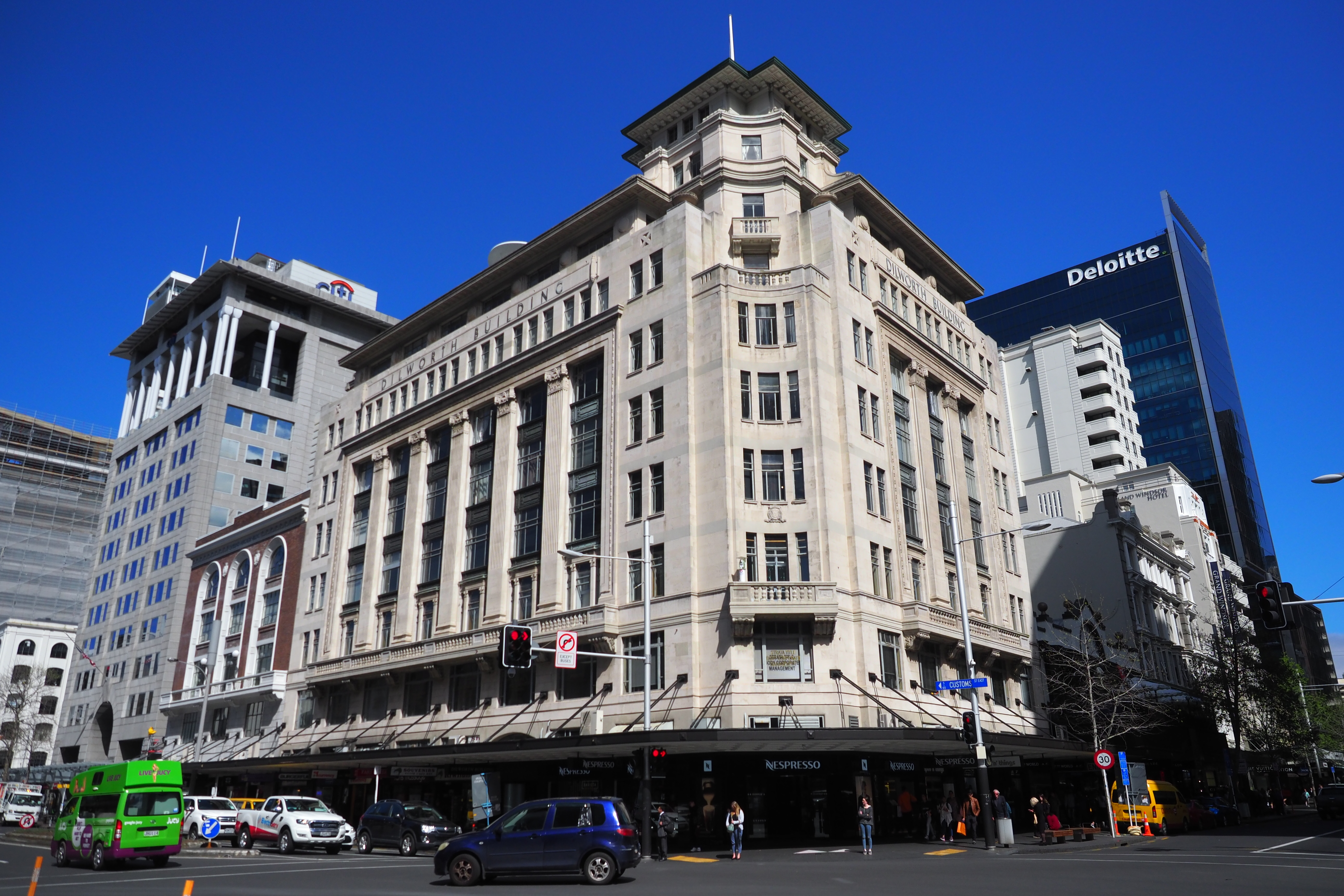
Dilworth Building

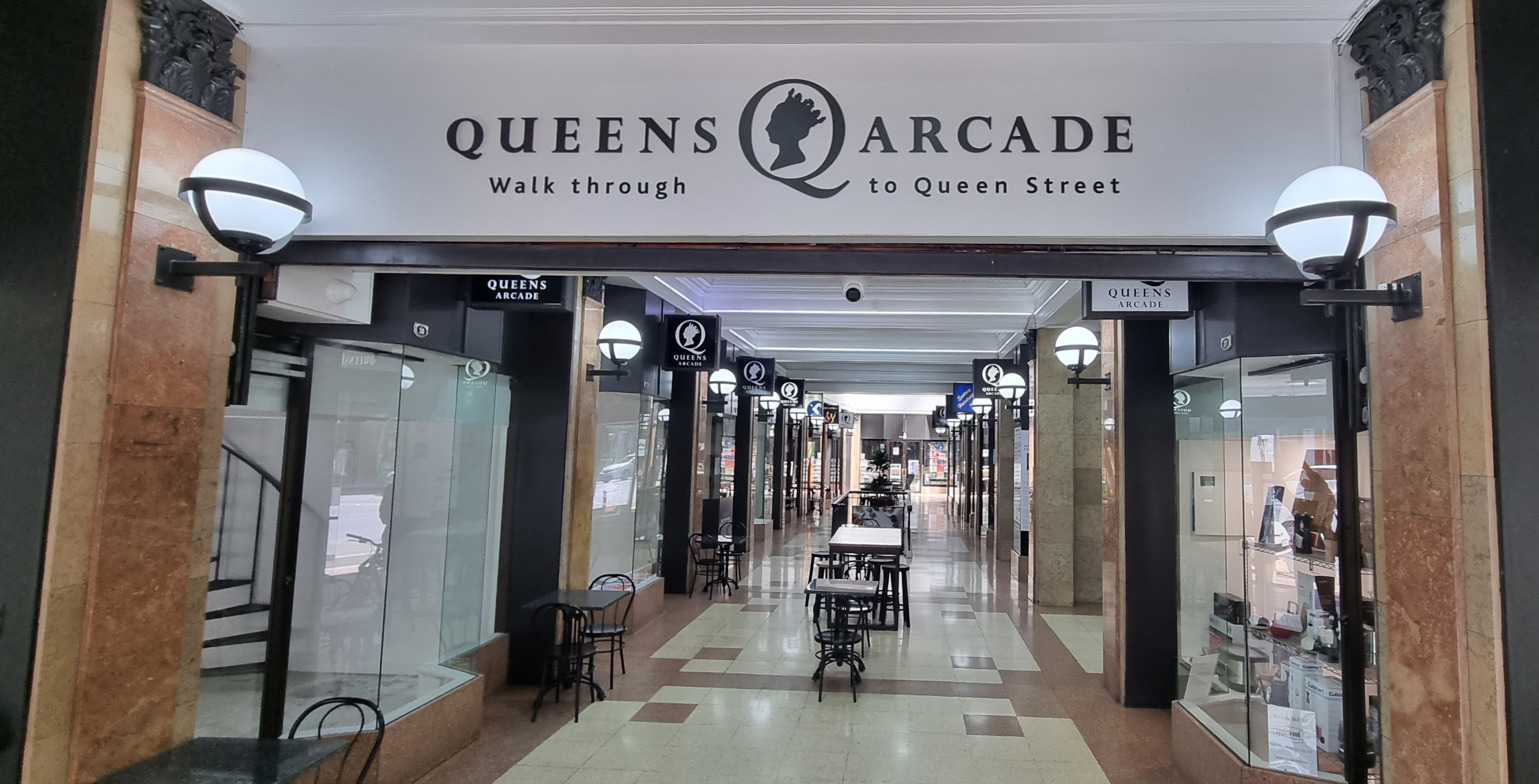
Queens Arcade

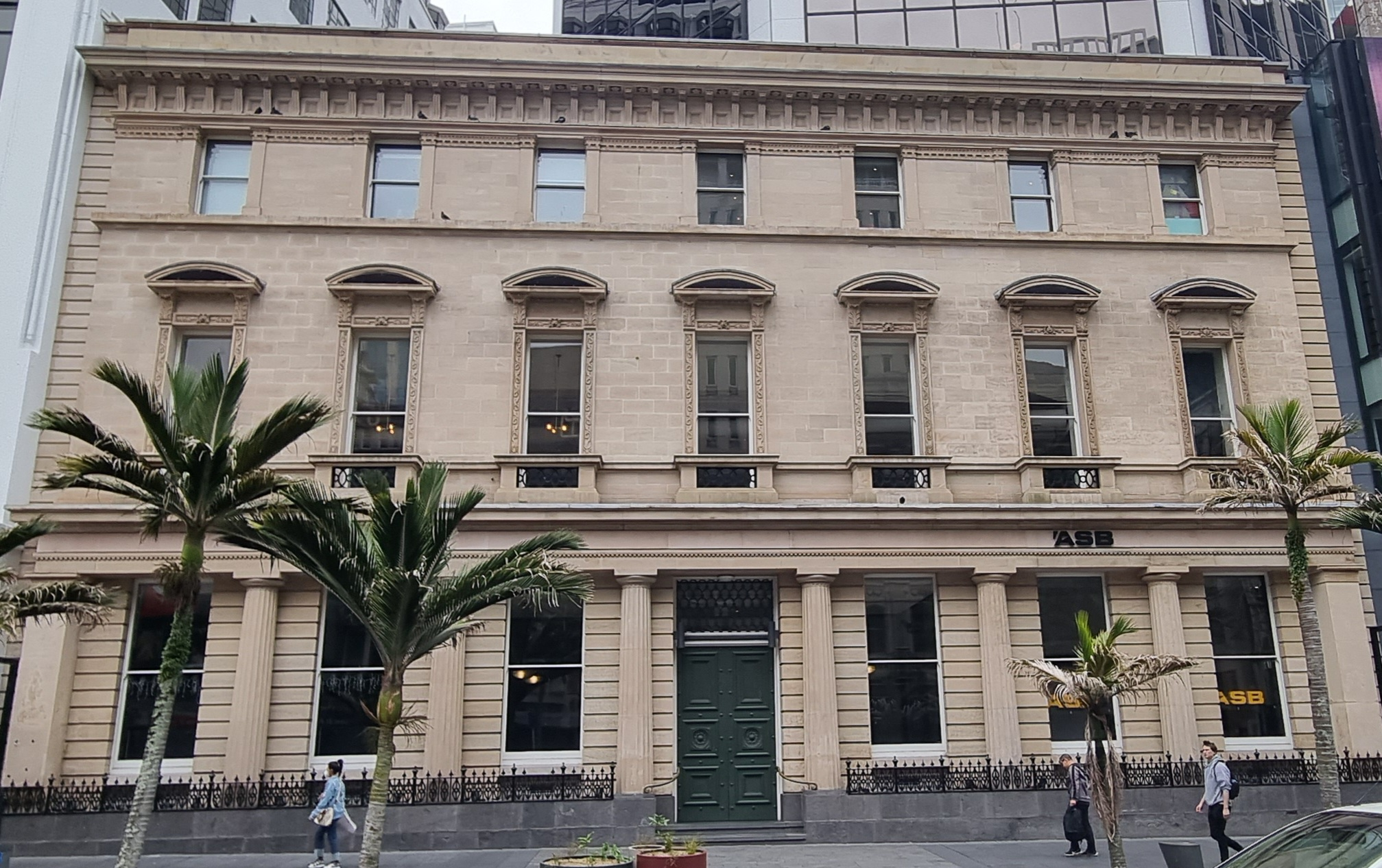
Bank of New Zealand Building

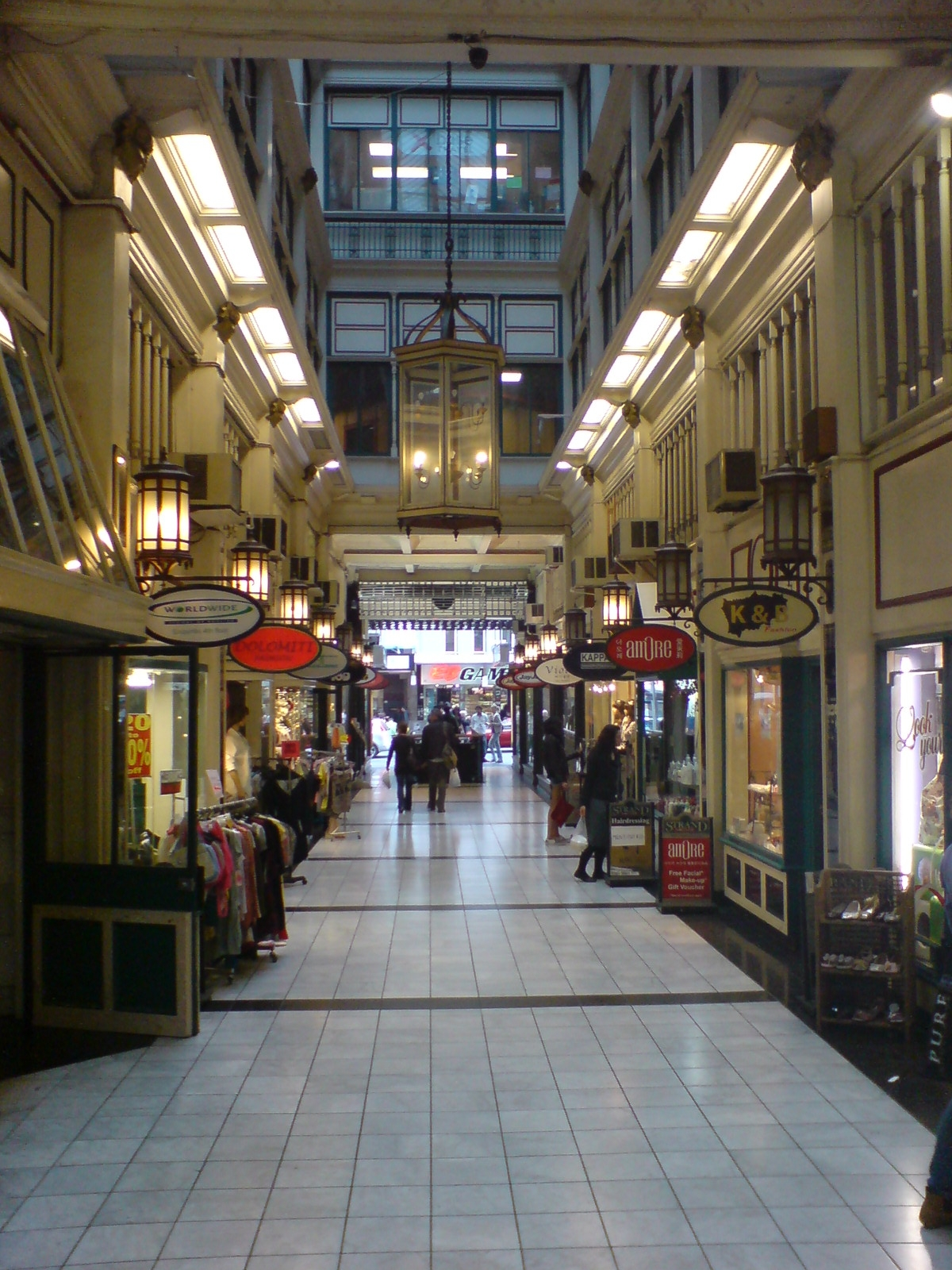
Strand Arcade

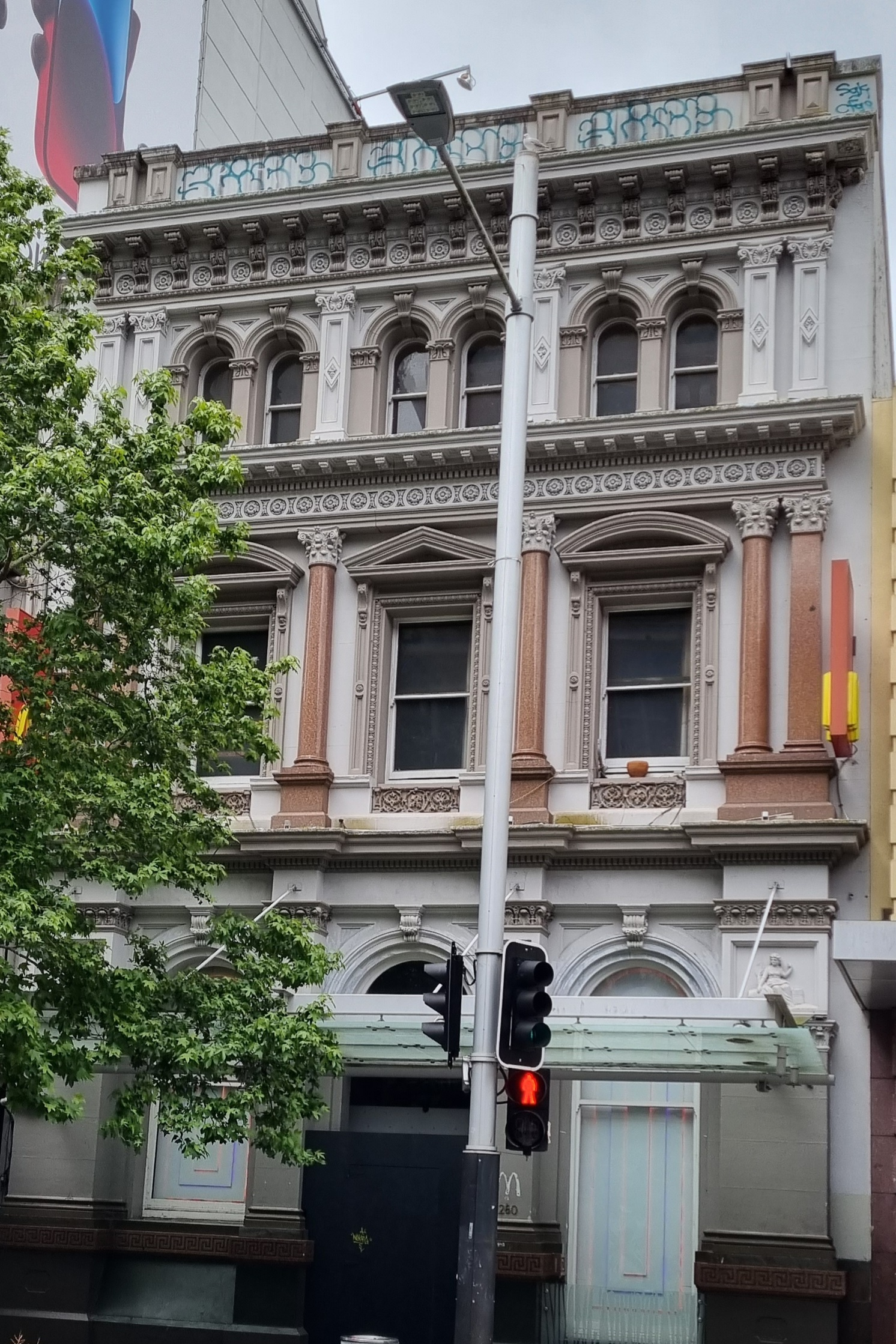
Auckland Savings Bank (Former)

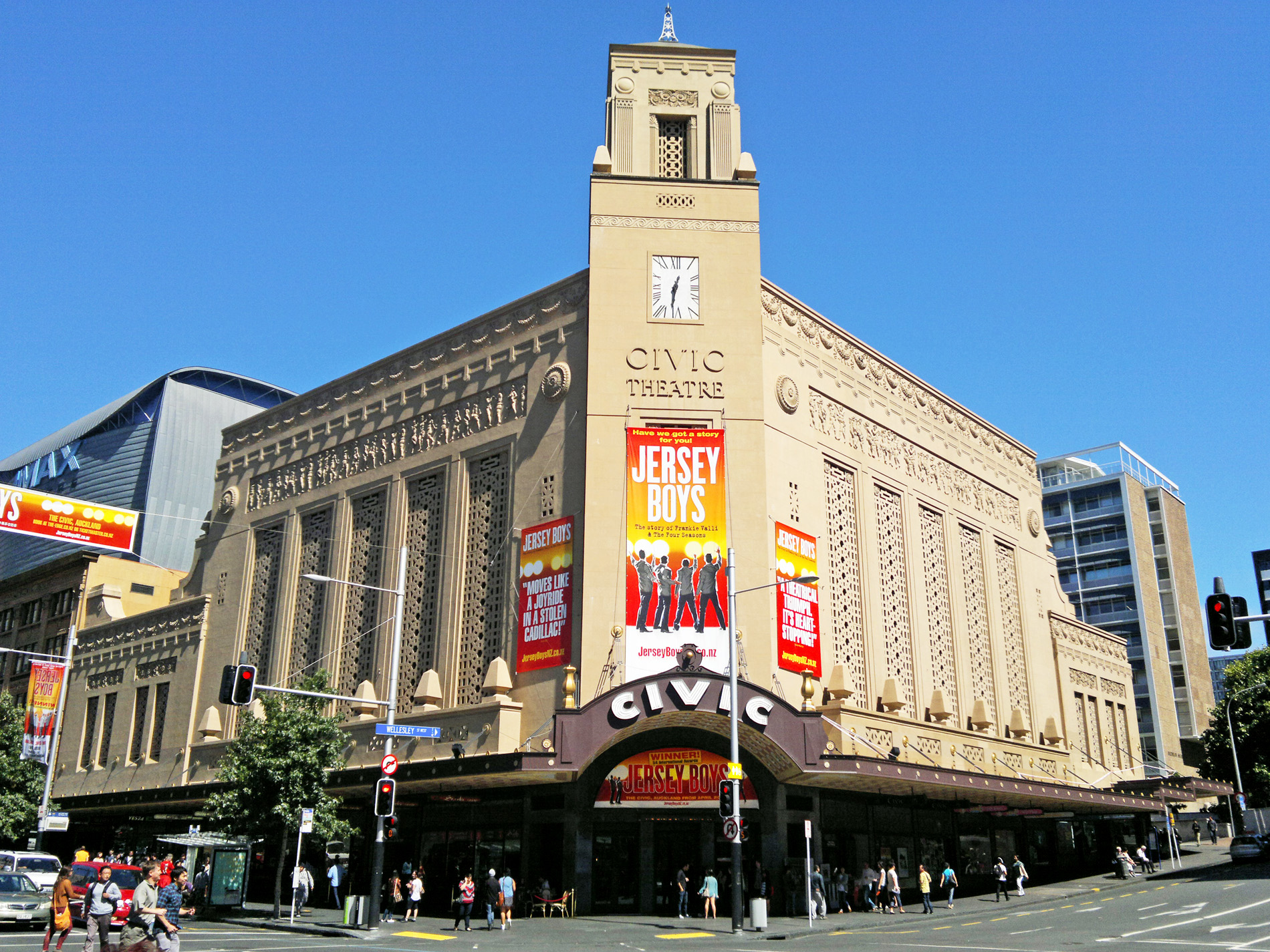
Civic Theatre

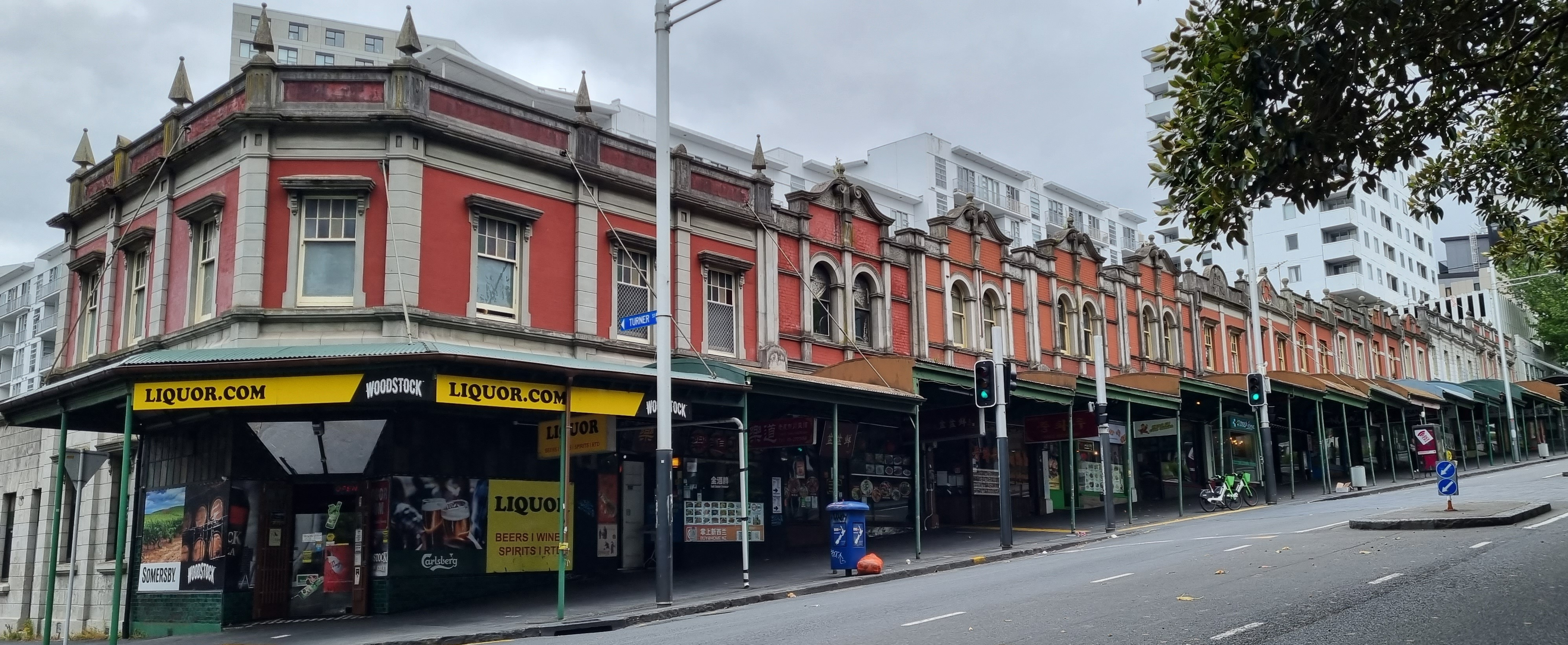
Terrace of Shops on Queen Street

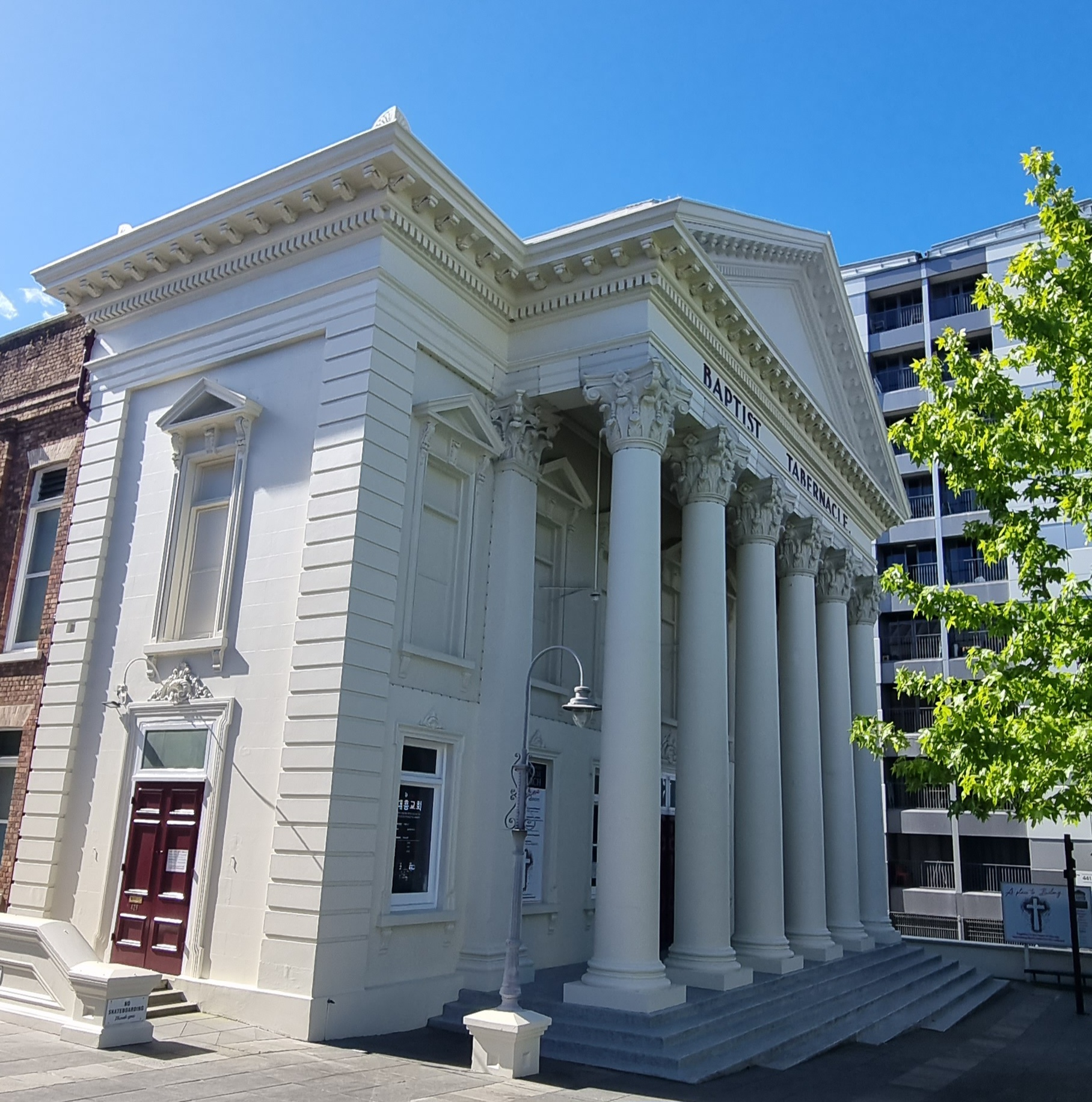
Auckland Baptist Tabernacle

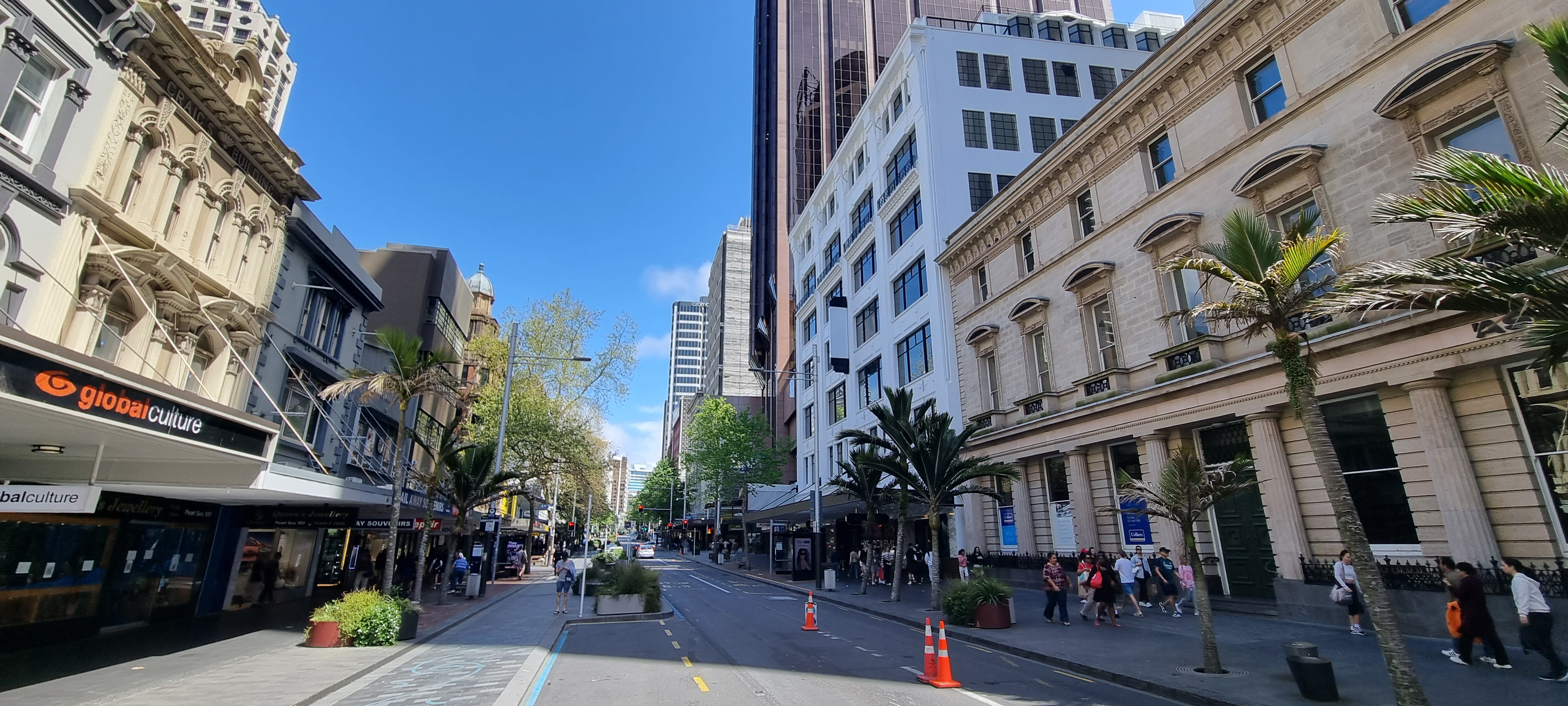
Queen Street in 2023
