= 80 Queen Street =

Skyscraper tower in Auckland, New Zealand

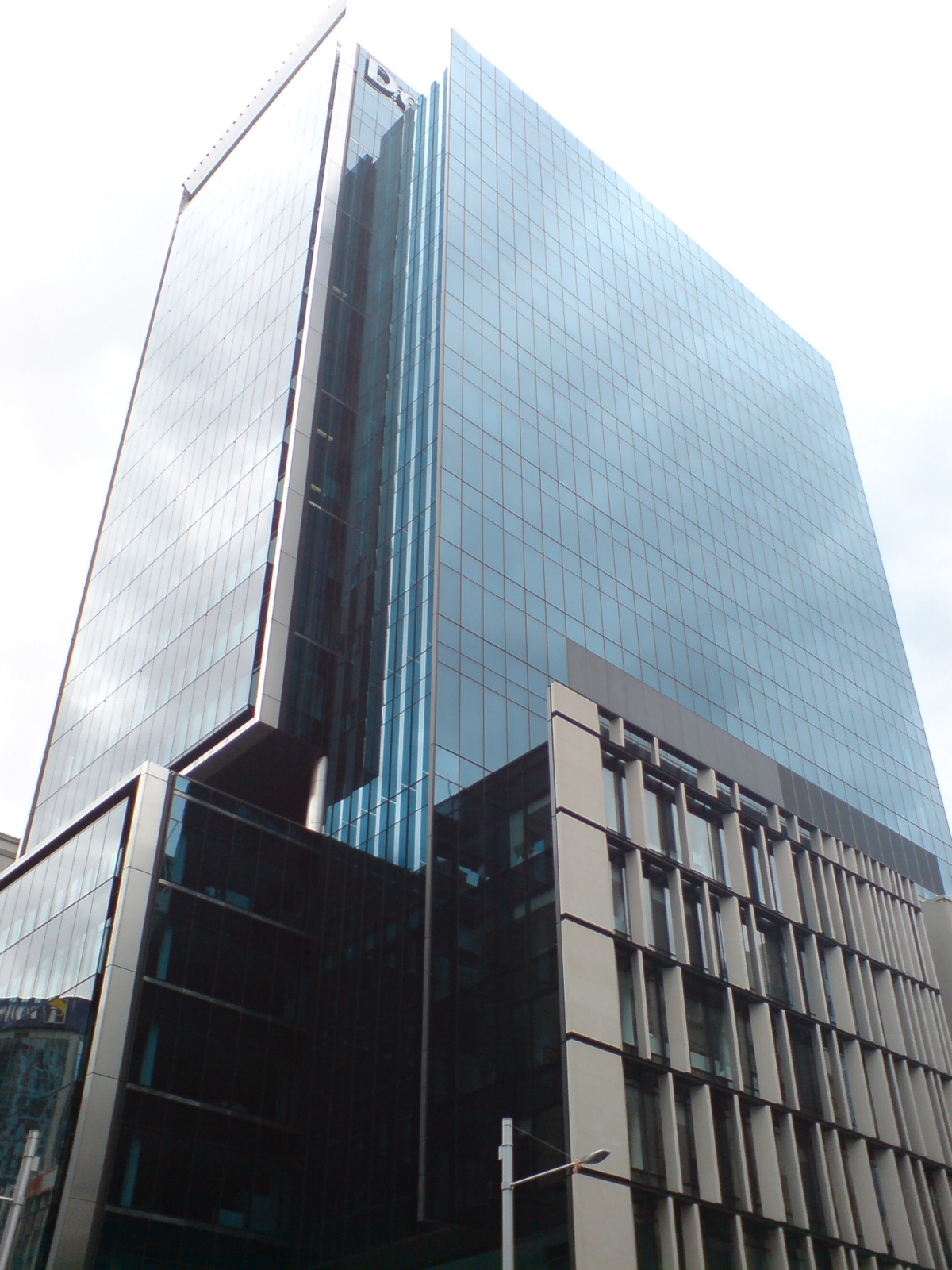
- The building finished in 2010
- Former names: Deloitte Centre

General information
- Status: Completed
- Type: Office
- Location: 80 Queen Street, Auckland, New Zealand
- Coordinates: 36.84617°S 174.76661°E
- Current tenants: Bank of New Zealand
- Construction started: September 2006; 20 years ago
- Completed: January 2010; 16 years ago
- Cost: $180 million

Height
- Height: 100 metres (330 feet)

Technical details
- Floor count: 25 (18 Leasable, 3 Mechanical, 4 Basement)

Design and construction
- Architecture firm: Woods Bagot, Warren and Mahoney
- Developer: Multiplex
- Main contractor: Multiplex

80 Queen Street, formerly the Deloitte Centre, is a skyscraper office tower in Queen Street, Auckland, New Zealand. Built between 2006–2009, it contains 18 levels of offices as well as four basement car parks and three levels of plant, and a special two-storey high architectural feature on the top giving a total height of 100 metres (330 feet). The building was one of the first skyscrapers to have a 5 star in the 'Green Star' environmental rating.

== History ==
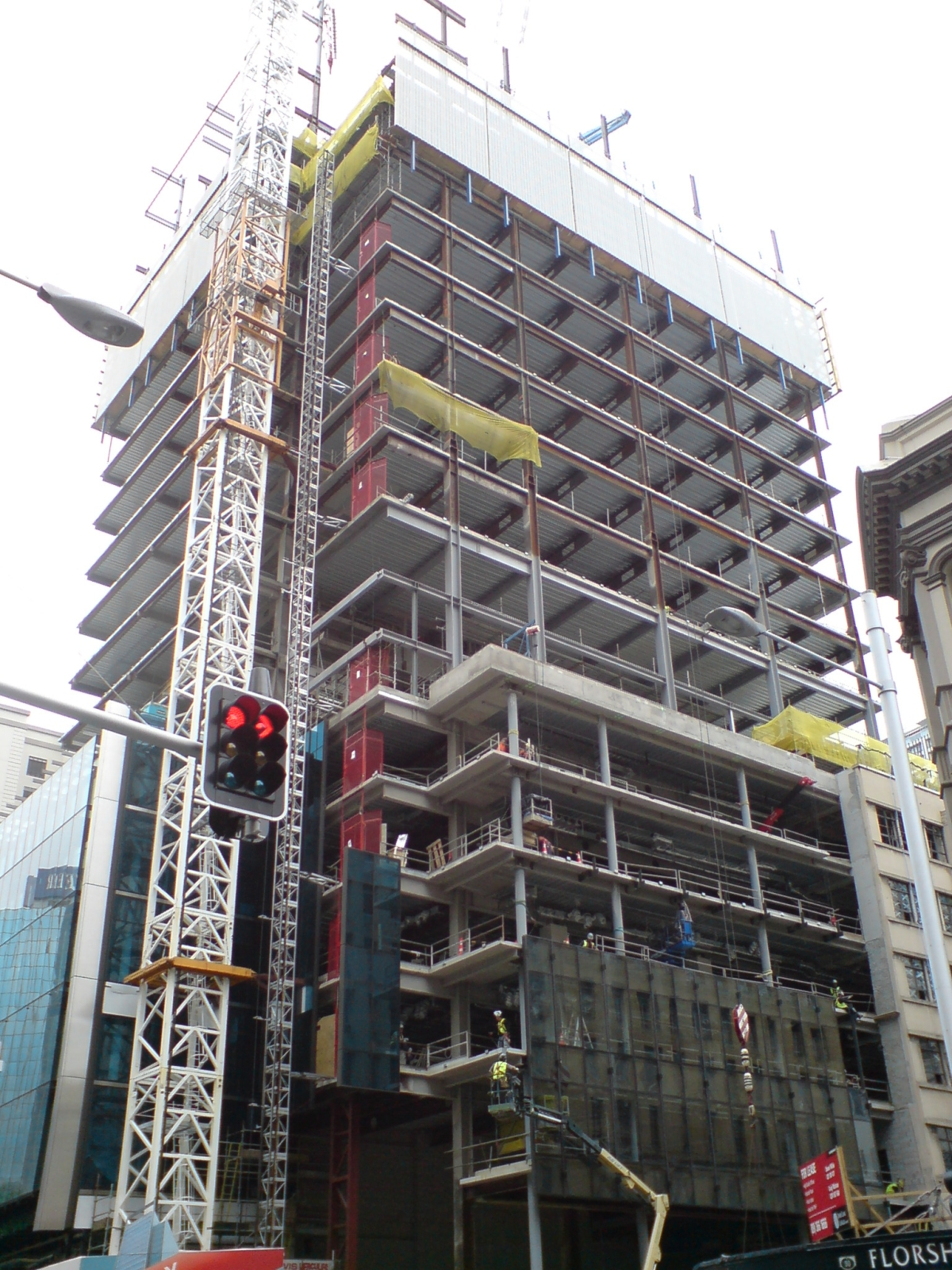
The building under construction in late 2008

80 Queen Street is built on an island site in the CBD, bordered by Queen Street, Shortland Street, Fort Street and Jean Batten Place. The site marks the beginning of the old shoreline of the 19th century. Everything north of the tower was under the Waitematā Harbour. The site had previously been occupied by a number of different buildings, including Victoria Arcade (built in 1885), then in 1978 Bank of New Zealand (BNZ) built their low-rise office block. In 2004, the BNZ entered into negotiations to build a skyscraper.

The building incorporates the facades of the Jean Batten Building on the rear sides and the rear (as seen from Queen Street). The demolition of this heritage building for the new development had created some criticism. The architects counter that significant parts of the older structure were retained or reconstructed after the new building went up, creating a positive combination.

Prior to 2024, approximately 56% of the office accommodation as well as 70 car parks and a large retail premises fronting Queen Street was leased to the Bank of New Zealand. The remaining 44% of the office accommodation was leased to Deloitte who occupied levels 11–18 including 100 car parks and the basement changing facilities until 2024. The building was named the Deloitte Centre.

In August 2021, in the lead-up to Deloitte's exit from 80 Queen Street, BNZ decided to expand their presence, with staff moving under one roof from their Quay Park site. In 2024, Deloitte moved from 80 Queen Street to One Queen Street and since then, 80 Queen Street has become solely occupied by BNZ.

== Tenants ==
Since 2024, BNZ has become the primary tenant, leasing the 18 office floors and main retail space.

True Alliance is another major tenant who is leasing retail units on the ground floor with international brand names such as Lacoste and The North Face.

The plant room will be situated at the upper levels and at level 7. The ground level will incorporate an entrance and 12-metre-high (39 ft) foyer at the corner of Queen and Shortland Street with the remainder of the ground level providing retail premises. Four levels of basement car parking will provide 170 car parks accessed from Fort Street.
