= Bank of New Zealand Building, Auckland =

Heritage New Zealand Category 1 Historic Place in Auckland, New Zealand

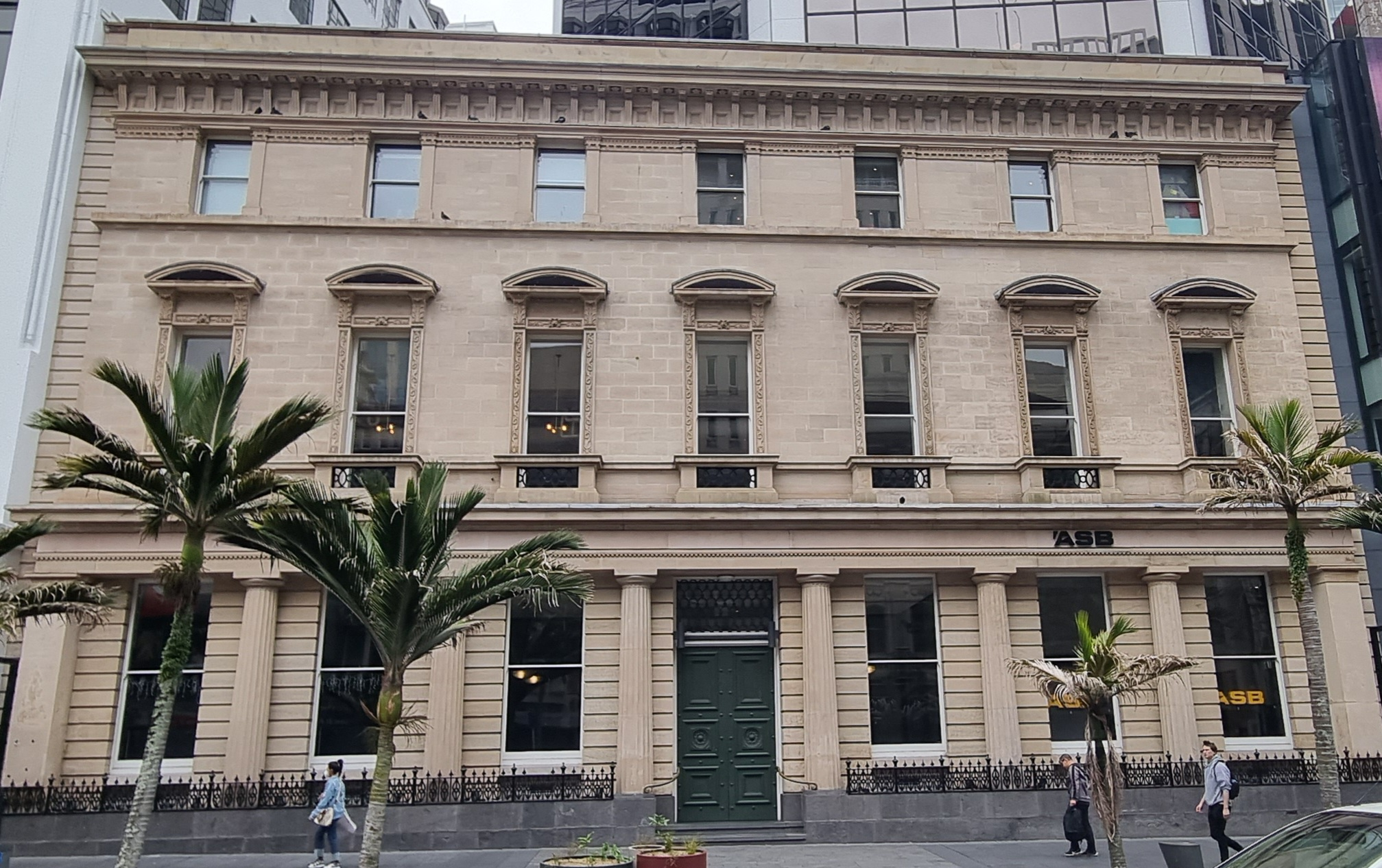
- Interactive map of the Bank of New Zealand Building, Auckland area

General information
- Location: 125 Queen Street, Auckland, New Zealand
- Coordinates: 36.846424158019744°S 174.76568262513325°E
- Construction started: 1866
- Opened: 1867
- Demolished: 1986

Design and construction
- Architect: Leonard Terry

Heritage New Zealand – Category 1
- Designated: 7-July-1982
- Reference no.: 95

The Bank of New Zealand Building is a Heritage New Zealand Category 1 Historic Place.

== History ==
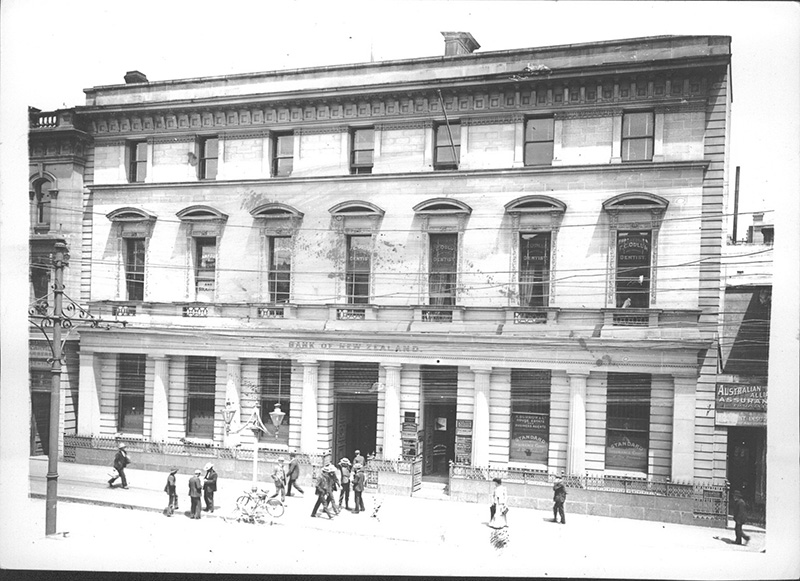
Late 19th/early 20th century photograph of the Bank of New Zealand Building

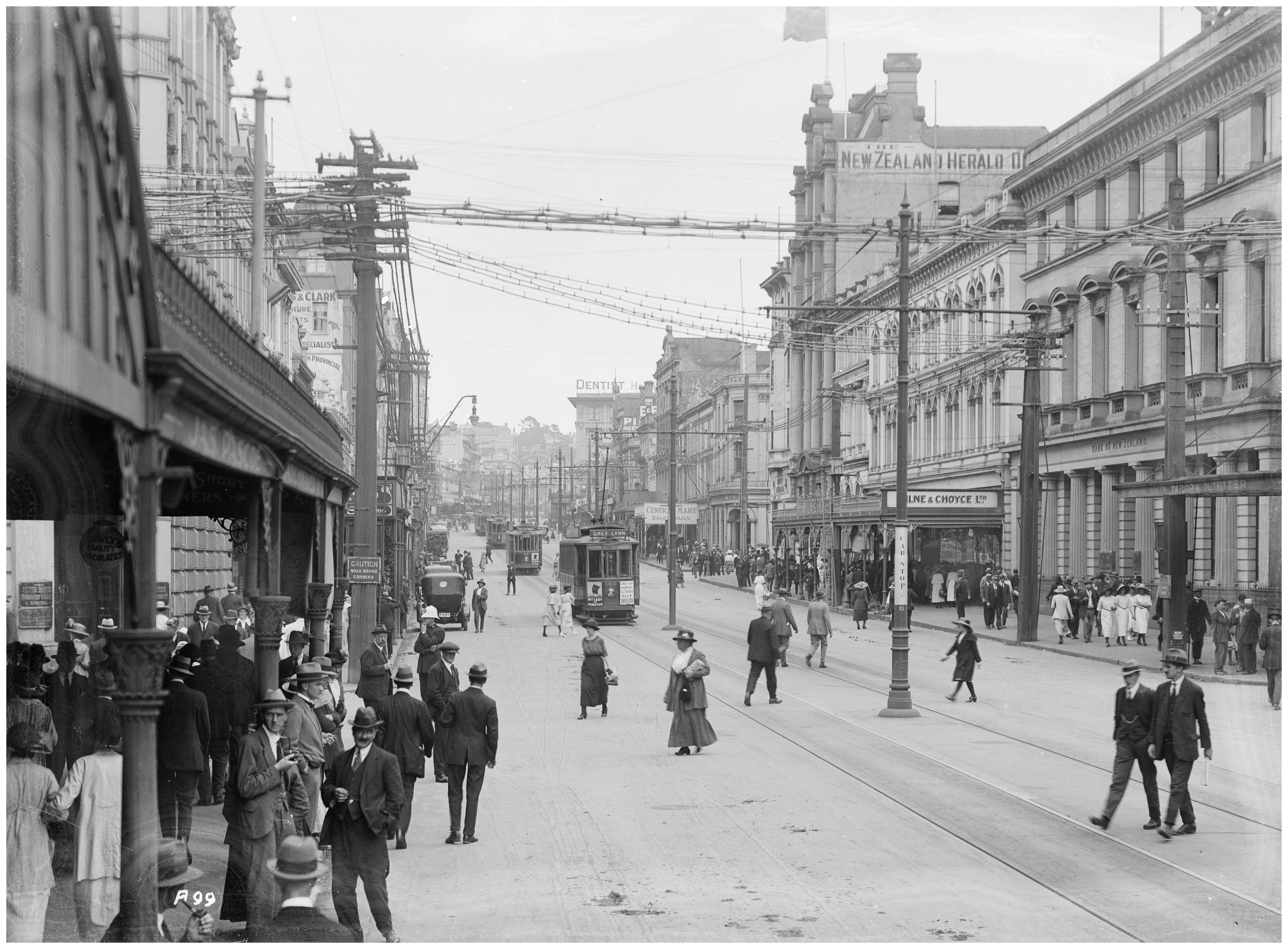
Bank of New Zealand Building and Queen Street, Auckland, March 1922.

The bank was constructed in 1866-1867 by the Bank of New Zealand. It was founded by Auckland business men in 1861, as part of a push back against the influence of Australian banks. The building was the site of the Bank of New Zealand headquarters. At the time, the three-storey building was one of the most prominent buildings on Queen Street.

== Architecture ==
Melbourne-based architect, Leonard Terry, designed the building in a Greek Revival Style. Tasmanian sandstone was used for the façade, which was originally proposed to have seven bays. Due to the recession, this was reduced to five bays. In 1866, the Lyttelton Times described the façade as:

"The first storey is Doric, the second is Italian, and the third of the somewhat indefinite style which some art critic has called Palatial both of these, however, brought into harmony with that which it supports, by accessories more or less ornate. The total height of the building will be sixty feet, that to the coping fifty-six feet. The building will be entered by a swing-door, massive and elaborately carved, flanked on either side by Grecian pillars, which impart an appearance of strength, which is relieved from heaviness by the lightness of the upper storeys. This storey is 18 feet to height. The storey immediately above this is 17 feet 6 inches, and consists of a row of windows with elaborate scroll-work, architraves, and circular pediments, resting upon substantial yet highly decorative trusses. The elect is exceedingly light, The next or third storey is distinguished by windows supporting a massive but ornate cornice, and is 11 feet in height. The general character of the front elevation is very chaste and elegant, however much a too severe criticism might be offended with an admixture of styles Which have certainly very little in common."

The building was extended in 1882 to include the final two bays. The rear of the building was also remodelled at this time to include a banking chamber. This required the reopening of the Tasmanian quarry that had since shut. The original building extended just 4.8m (16 feet) back from the frontage. In 1986, all but the façade was demolished.
