= Dorothy Robertson =

New Zealand artist (died 1979)

- Paton's Rock, New Year's Eve (1947)
- Born: Dorothy Elizabeth Rodgers; Margate, Kent, England
- Died: 1979
- Known for: Painting
- Spouse: Dr Malcolm Robertson
- Awards: Mention Honourable from Grand Palais, Champ-Elysees, Paris.

Dorothy Elizabeth Robertson (née Rogers, died 1979) was a New Zealand artist.

== Background ==
Born Dorothy Rogers near Margate, in Kent, England, into a naval family of six children, Robertson's father was a captain in the British Navy and, as a result, the family moved around the British Isles. She was the Great-Granddaughter of Major General Sir William Henry Sleeman and Amélie Josephine de Fontenne, the daughter of exiled French nobleman Jacques François Joseph Blandin de Chalain.

Between the ages of 14 and 19 years Dorothy drew advertisements for products such as Beecham's Pills, which were published in the Daily Mail. After leaving school, she qualified as a nurse and met her future husband, Dr Malcolm Robertson from Christchurch, New Zealand, while working in a hospital. After marrying, Dorothy and her husband returned to New Zealand, where he practiced as an ear, nose and throat surgeon until retiring 30 years later. They had three sons who all became doctors. When the two eldest sons left home to study in England, Dorothy returned to concentrate on her painting. She worked from studios in her home in Christchurch and at Patons Rock, near Tākaka, Golden Bay. The family's motor launch the Nautilus is now a fixture of the New Zealand Maritime Museum, in Auckland.

== Career ==
Dorothy's first artwork was accepted in 1951 by the Societe des Artistes Francais, at the Grand Palais, Champ-Elysees, Paris. In 1960 Dorothy received a Mention Honourable (award of merit) from the salon. In March 1969, an issue of the French art magazine La Revue Moderne featured one of Dorothy's paintings, 'Crayfishing, Kaikoura', on its cover, and a page inside was devoted to her work. Dorothy exhibited 32 paintings at the Societe des artistes Francais over 25 years. After noting her many successes between 1951 and 1974, the director of a famous private art gallery, Galerie Vallombreuse in Biarritz, decided to hold an exhibition of the New Zealander's art.

Despite her success in Europe, and as a commercial and then portrait painter, Dorothy's work was rejected in her adopted home town of Christchurch, New Zealand. Canterbury art journals from the time record clashes between Robertson and critics and artists associated with "the Group", which included important New Zealand regional modernists like communist party member Rita Angus, and Colin McCahon. Her work was hung in the Royal Academy in London, the Royal Scottish Academy, the Society of Women Artists Exhibition in London and many other British galleries.

Robertson also exhibited with:

- Auckland Society of Arts
- Canterbury Society of Arts
- New Zealand Academy of Fine Arts
