= Ted Ashby (1993) =

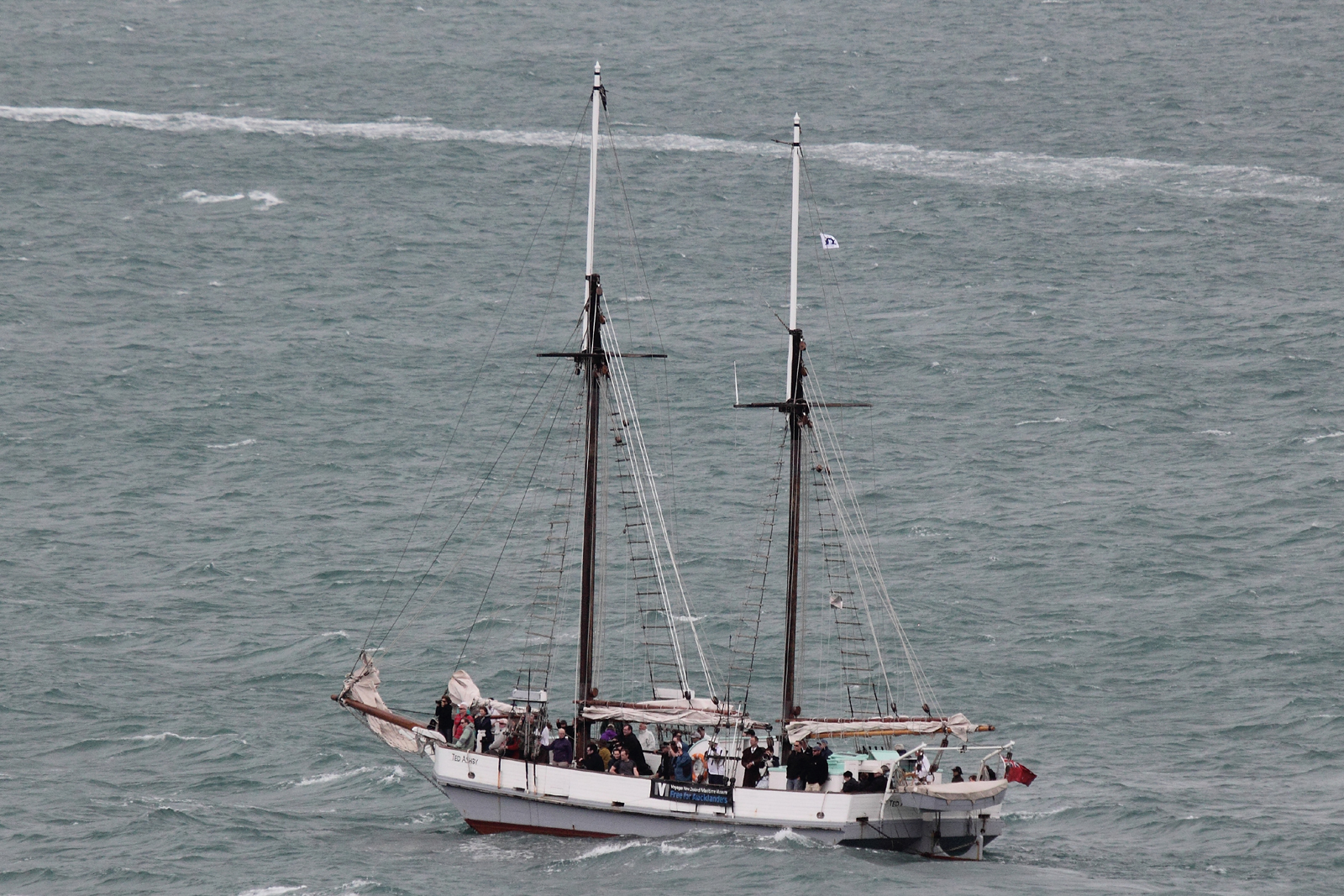
- Ted Ashby sailing Waitematā Harbour

History

New Zealand
- Name: Ted Ashby
- Namesake: Ted Ashby (Auckland scowman)
- Owner: New Zealand Maritime Museum - Hui Te Ananui A Tangaroa
- Port of registry: Auckland, New Zealand
- Builder: New Zealand Maritime Museum - Hui Te Ananui A Tangaroa
- Launched: August 1993
- Maiden voyage: December 1993, Waitematā Harbour

General characteristics
- Type: Scow
- Length: 17.4 m (57.06 ft)
- Beam: 5.5 m (18 ft)
- Draught: 0.6 m (2 ft)
- Notes: Blackbutt, totara, matai, douglas fir (materials)

Ted Ashby is a gaff-rigged ketch deck scow built in Auckland in 1993. She is a replica of Auckland and Northland regions' original scow fleet from the late 19th and early 20th centuries. Berthed at Hui Te Ananui A Tangaroa, the New Zealand Maritime Museum, she is one of four boats in the museum's operating collection. She is also the last known scow boat built in New Zealand.

== History ==
Ted Ashby was built in Mechanics Bay, Auckland, between 1992 and 1993 by a large group of staff and volunteers from the New Zealand Maritime Museum, using traditional scow building materials and techniques. The construction was primarily sponsored by New Zealand logistics and transport company Freightways.

=== Design and construction ===
Before its official opening in 1993, the museum originally intended to acquire an existing local scow for its boat collection. However, none were considered satisfactory, so it was decided by the museum's trust board that a new scow would be built from scratch. In 1992, a draft scow sketch was presented to Auckland shipwright Max Carter, who took on Ted Ashby's construction as project manager. While Carter collaborated with a draughtsman on detailed building plans, construction facilities and materials were sought.

A workshop in Mechanics Bay was found with a three ton overhead gantry crane, which Carter noted became invaluable for the build. In order to give the low draught boat necessary stability, a heavy timber was chosen for the hull. Due to the scows' traditional kauri wood no longer being widely available, the hull was made instead with Australian blackbutt, grown in Kerikeri and milled at Totara North, Northland. However, other antique scow materials were used, such as oakum for caulking, as well as totara timber and schenam for sheathing.

Ted Ashby was constructed using the traditional method of placing the hull upside down on a sliding cradle, which Carter noted made sheathing easier and reduced labour. Other than Carter, only a small number of the museum's staff had knowledge of building heavy wooden ships like scows. Older volunteers who had worked on scows in prior decades offered their varying advice and experiences, which, according to the museum's public projects manager at the time, sparked "a lively dialogue within [New Zealand's] maritime industry". A reflection on her building process in the 1993 article 'Skills as Cultural Treasures' in Bearings, the museums former quarterly magazine, states "one can look back with great satisfaction upon the process of learning, and information and skills exchange ... a couple of dozen boatbuilders now possess old skills that they may never otherwise have acquired".

Overall, Ted Ashby's construction took 18 months. and 11,000 hours of labour by 50 staff and volunteer boatbuilders, supported by 50 company sponsors. She costed approximately $500,000, including $120,000 worth of materials donated through gifts and discounts, without which Carter stated "the scow would not be what she is".

=== Launch and maiden voyage ===
Ted Ashby was launched by Dame Jenny Gibbs in August 1993 for the museum's public opening. Gibbs is an art collector, philanthropist and wife of Alan Gibbs, the former chairman of Freightways. The opening came a couple weeks before Ted Ashby's building completion, resulting in her launching without a full sailing rig. Her maiden voyage in Waitematā Harbour took place early December of the same year.

Currently, Ted Ashby is operated by New Zealand Maritime Museum volunteers for daily visitor excursions around Waitematā Harbour.

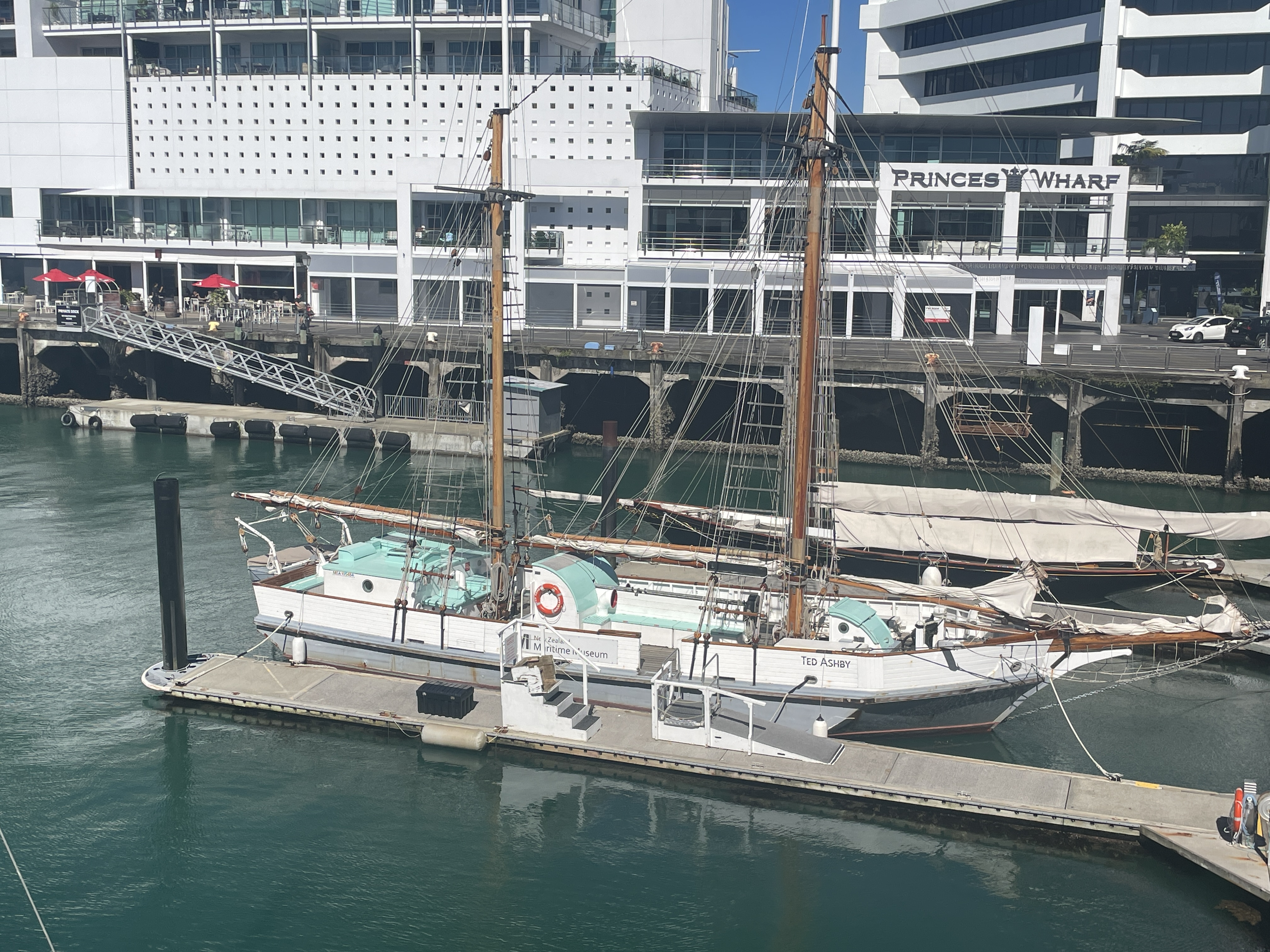
Ted Ashby berthed at Hobson Wharf, outside the New Zealand Maritime Museum

== Namesake ==
Ted Ashby was initially called the Freightways Scow, after her main company sponsor, Freightways Holdings Ltd. Alan Gibbs, the chairman of Freightways at the time, had strong family ties to the building of New Zealand's original scow boats during their heyday.

Eventually, the museum renamed her Ted Ashby, in honour of Edward Ashby, the writer, poet and Auckland scowman of 50 years. He began working on scows in 1923, and in 1975, published the history book Phantom Fleet: The Scows and Scowmen of Auckland.

== Scows in New Zealand ==
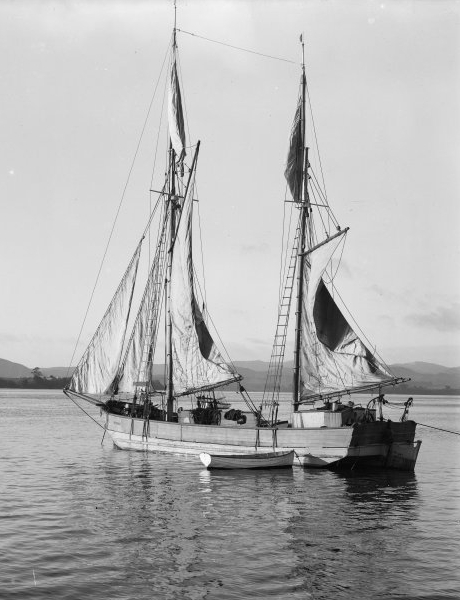
Winnie, an original New Zealand scow c.1900s

Ted Ashby is a replica of New Zealand's original scow boats, a fleet of 130 vessels built between 1873 and 1925. They were used primarily as coastal and river traders in Auckland and Northland, carrying heavy cargo such as timber, machinery and livestock. Occasionally, they also did journeys across the Tasman Sea to New South Wales, Australia.

Their design originated in the Great Lakes of North America, and were adapted to local conditions. Their punt shape and shallow draught allowed them to operate in shallow waters of local beaches, rivers and estuaries. They were a key mode of transport before New Zealand developed extensive road networks, making the scows an integral element of the country's early coastal trade.

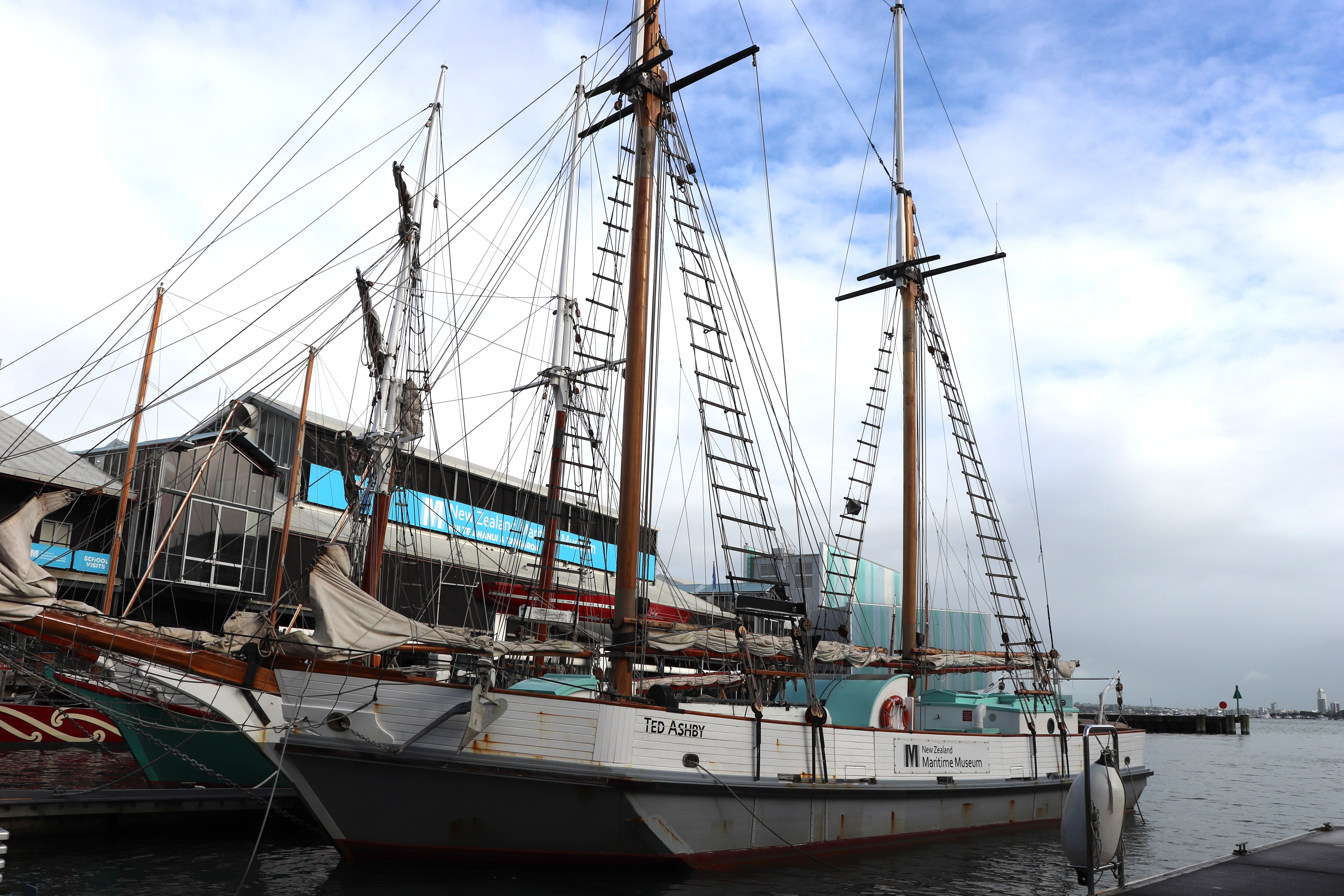
Ted Ashby berthed at Hobson Wharf

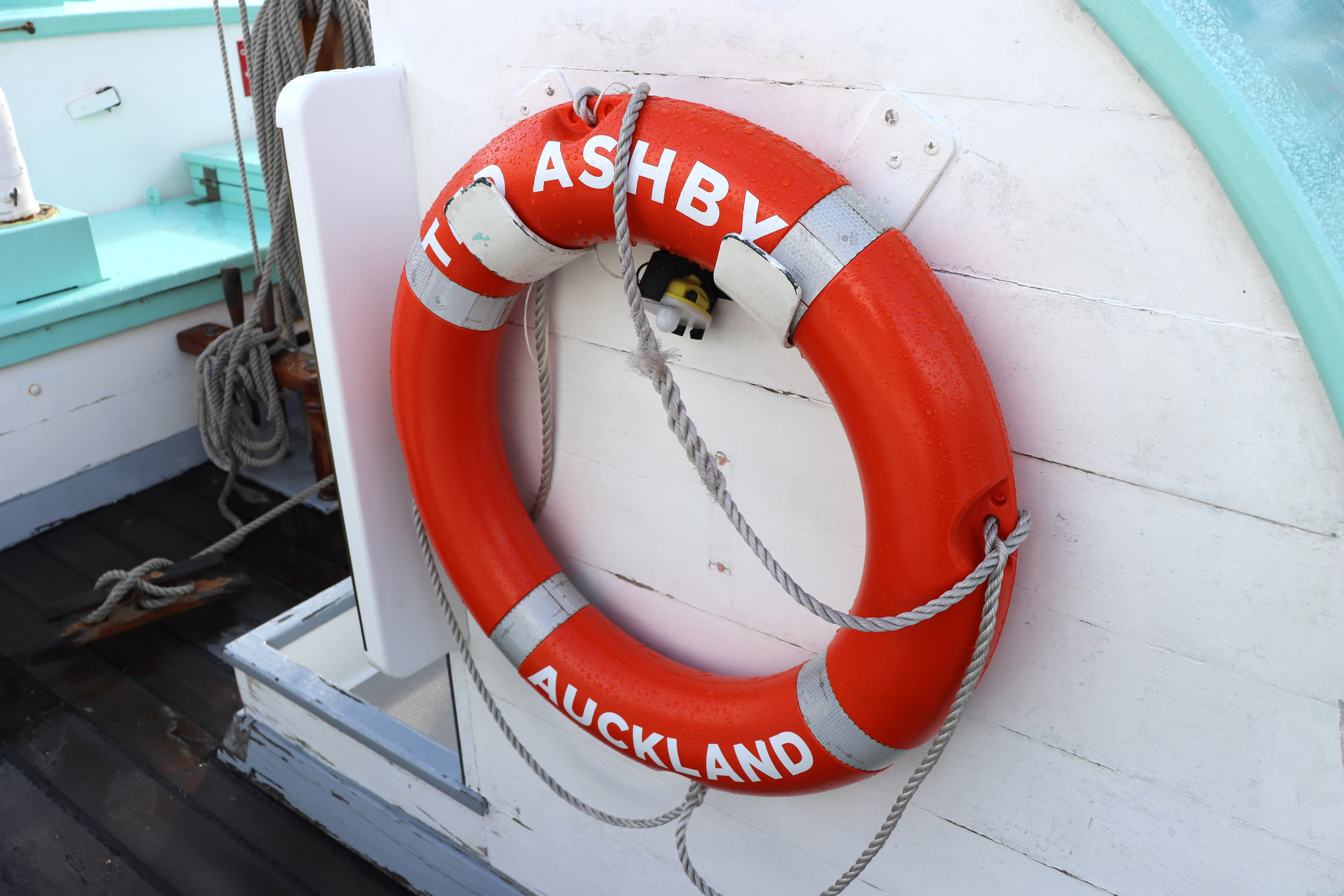
Ted Ashby's life buoy

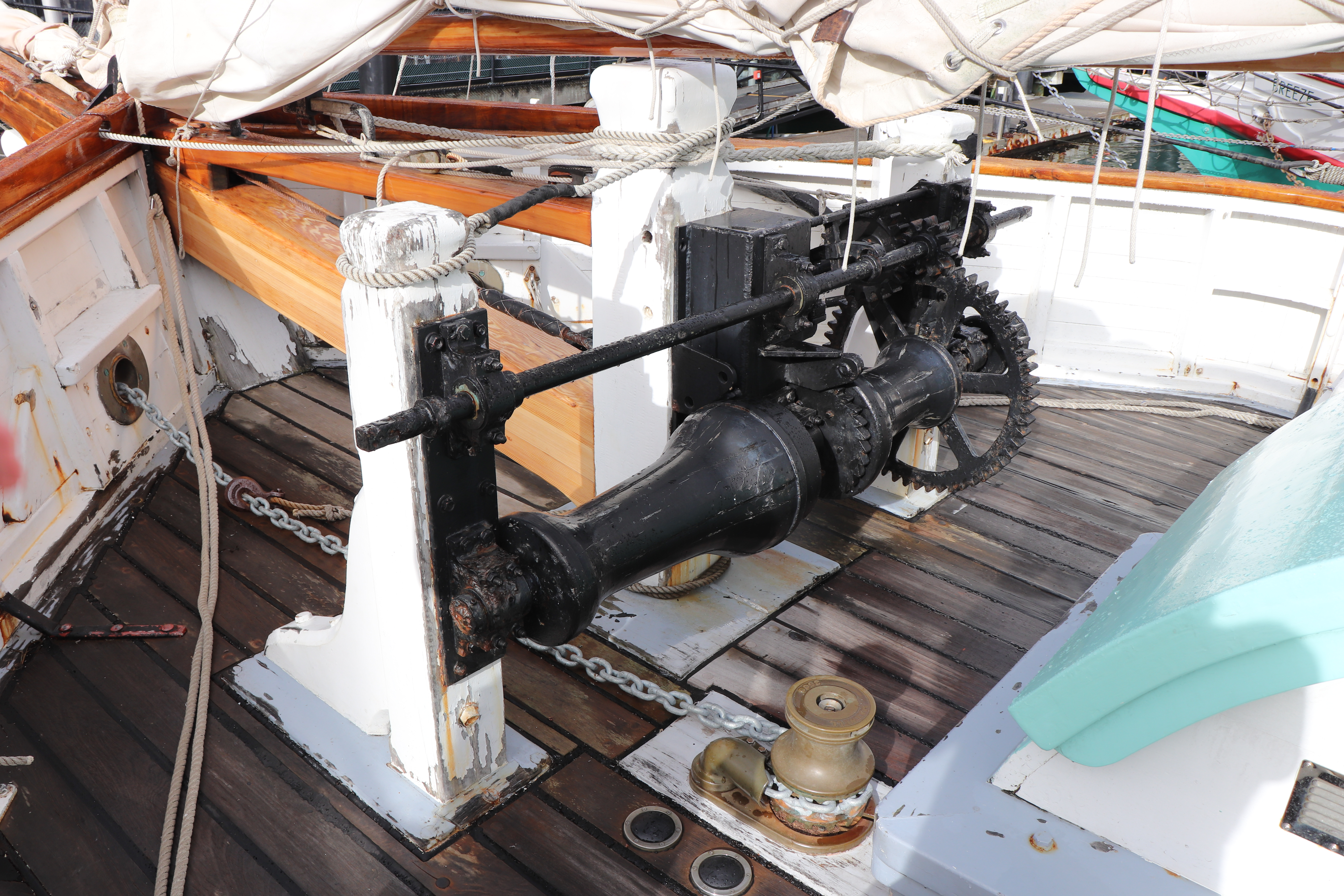
Ted Ashby's anchor windlass

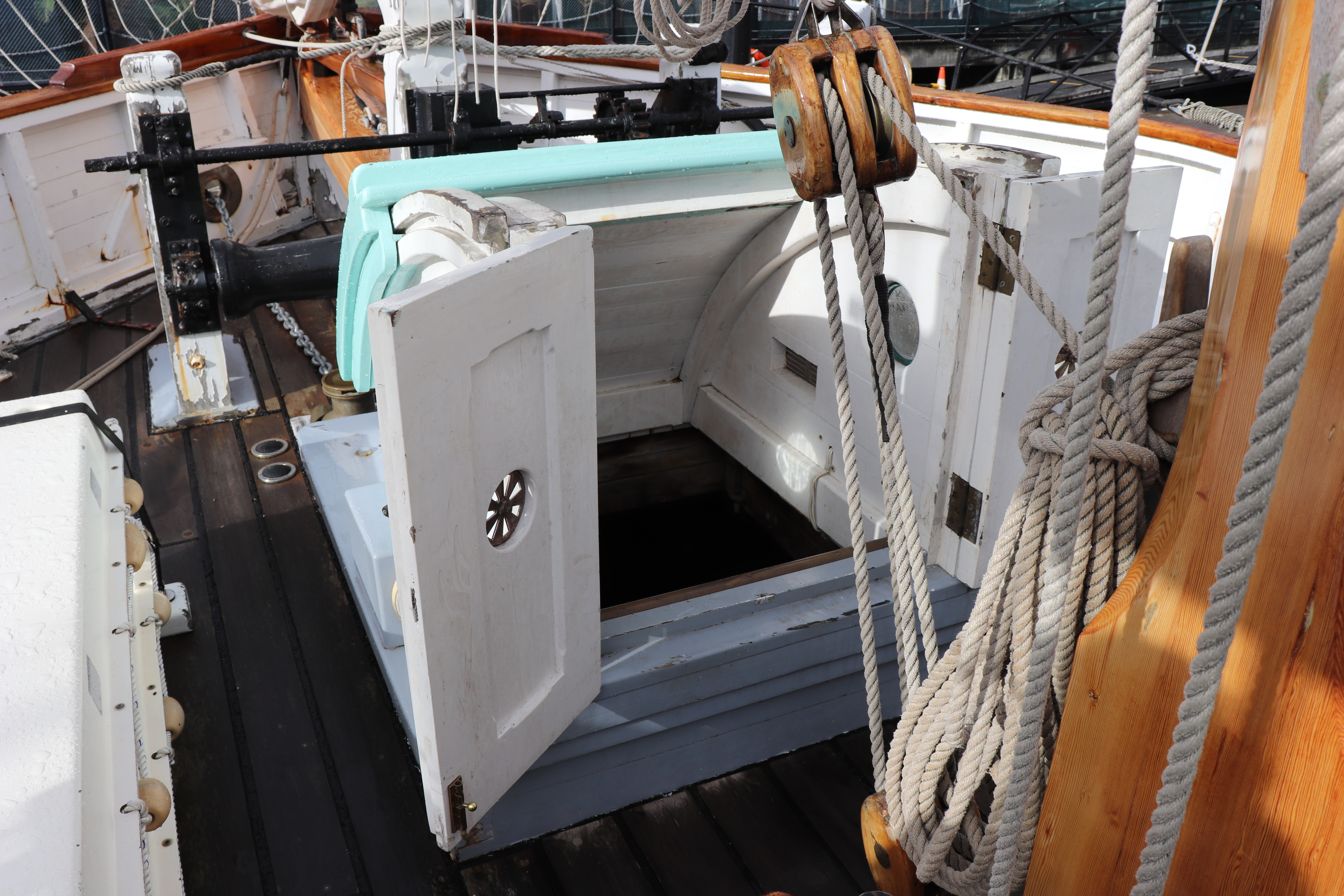
Ted Ashby's cabin entry door

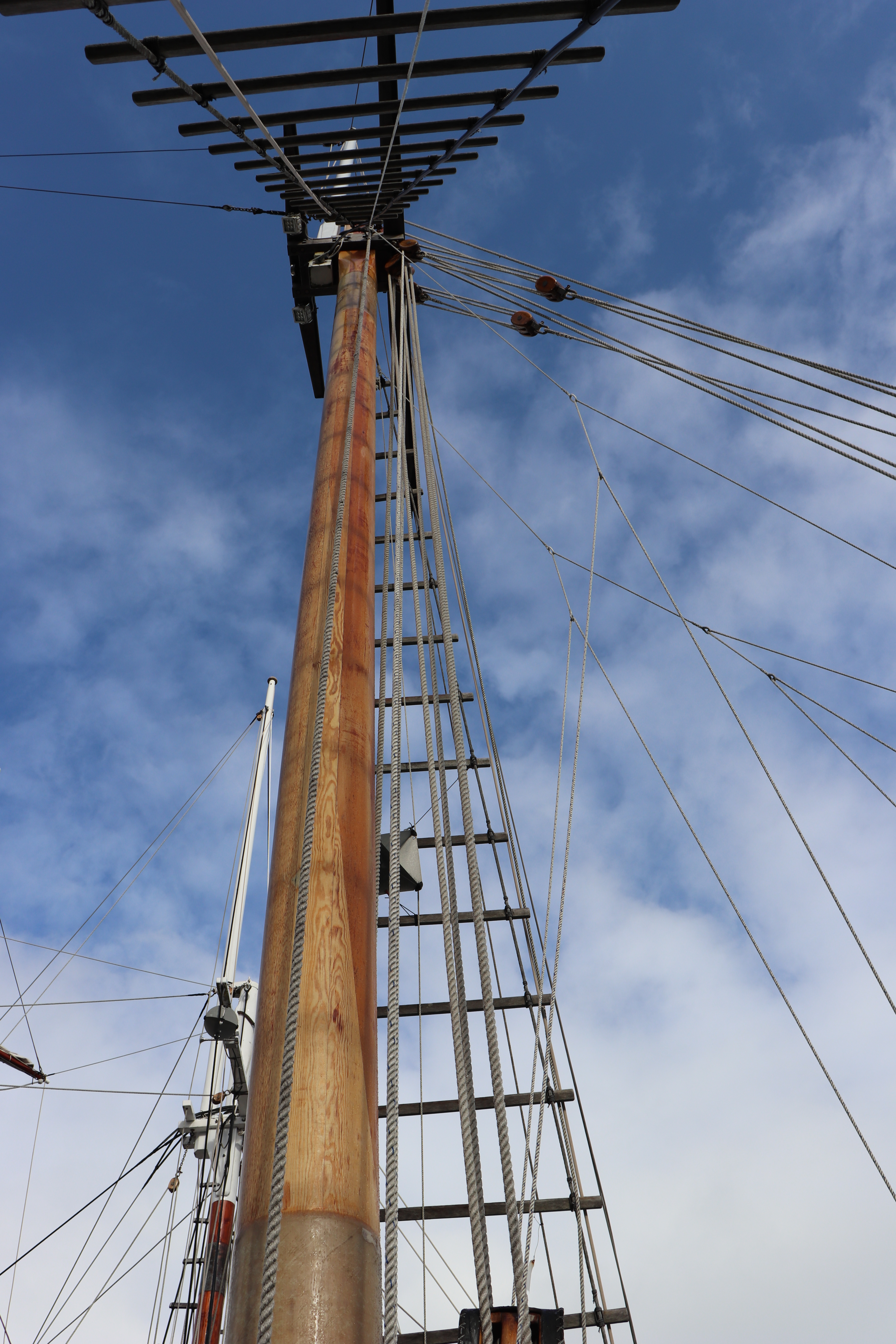
Ted Ashby's rigging

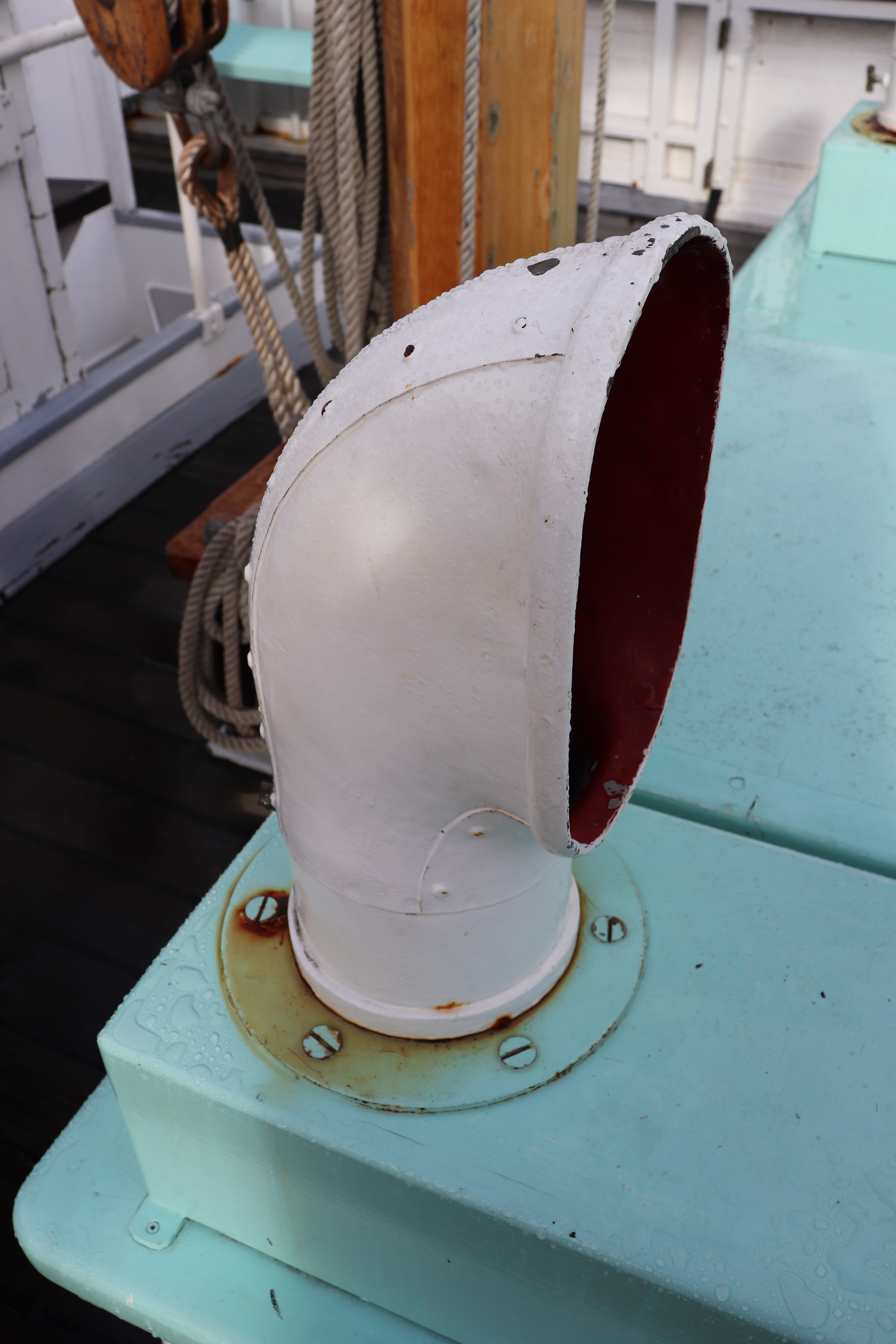
Ted Ashby's air vent
