= Nautilus (motor launch) =

New Zealand motor launch (1913)

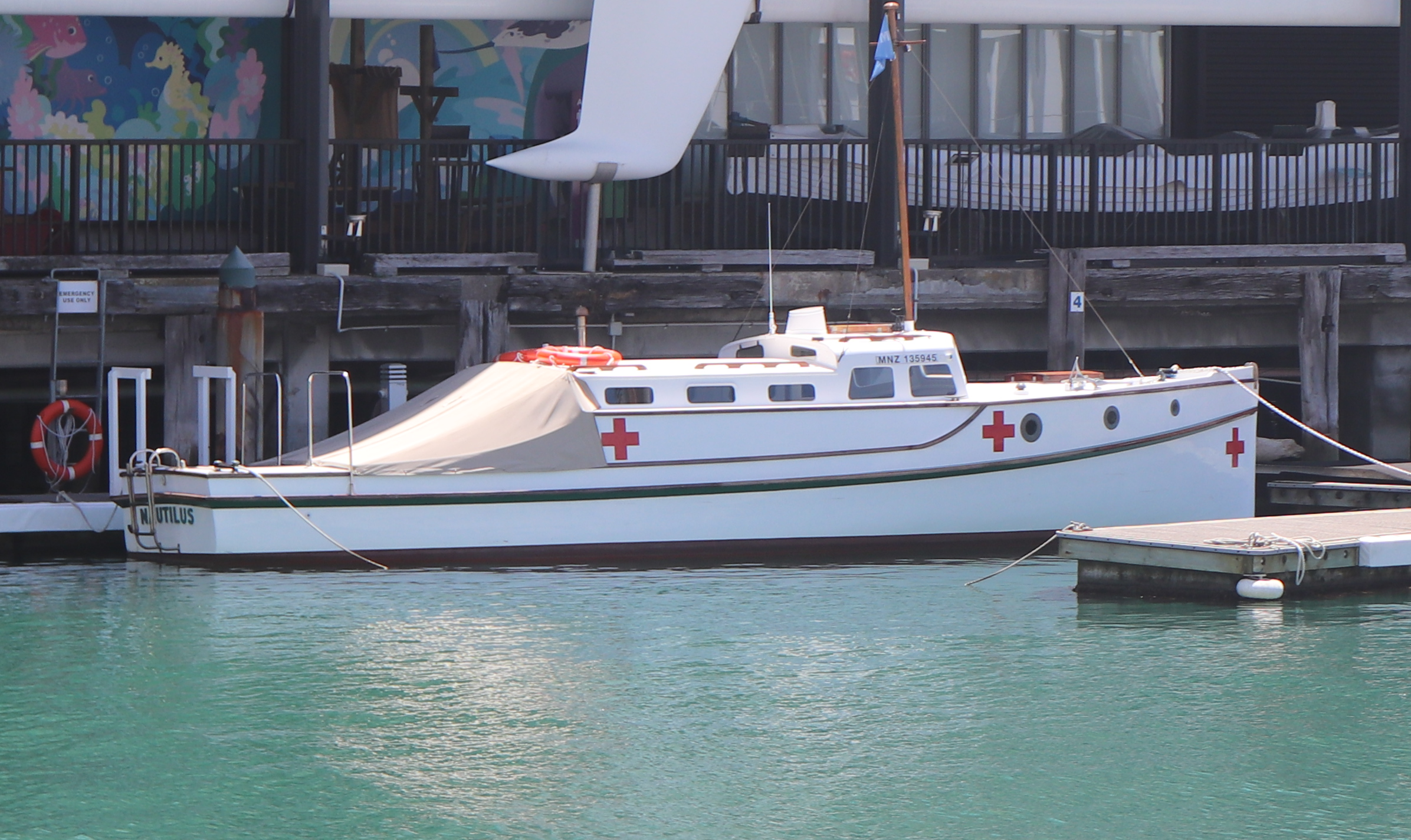

History

New Zealand
- Name: Nautilus
- Owner: 1913–1925 Fred Horace Edwin Chester; 1925–? Harry Hawkins; 1994–2011 Allan Williams; 2011 acquired by the New Zealand Maritime Museum
- Builder: Collings & Bell
- Completed: 1913

General characteristics
- Type: Motor launch
- Length: 36.06 ft (10.99 m)
- Beam: 8.83 ft (2.69 m)
- Notes: Made of kauri wood

Nautilus is a motor launch built in Auckland, New Zealand, in 1913. Named after a kind of cephalopod, it is berthed at Hui Te Ananui A Tangaroa, the New Zealand Maritime Museum. The vessel is the oldest of the four boats in the museum's working fleet.

== History ==
Nautilus was built in 1913 at Collings & Bell shipyard in Auckland's Saint Marys Bay. She was built for her original owner, Fred Horace Edwin Chester, an electrical engineer at the Canterbury Frozen Meat Company living in Christchurch, New Zealand. By 1914, Nautilus was moored on the Avon River / Ōtākaro. Chester was a member of the New Brighton Power Boat Club and used Nautilus as a family vessel for picnics and racing.

=== World War I ===
In 1915, Chester lent Nautilus to the New Zealand Army after being conscripted himself. She was refitted for service, including a new hospital livery according to the Hague Convention; white with a green stripe and three red crosses. She also displayed a New Zealand ensign flag at the aft and a red cross flag at the bow. Nautilus was a launch onboard the hospital ship SS Marama's first commission to the Mediterranean in 1915. Despite her refitting, Nautilus was ill-adapted to war service, breaking down at Colombo, Sri Lanka on this initial voyage. For most of the war, she assisted Marama in transporting sick and maimed troops back to New Zealand from Europe and the Middle East, being primarily used to pick up wounded soldiers from shore at anchorages without wharves.

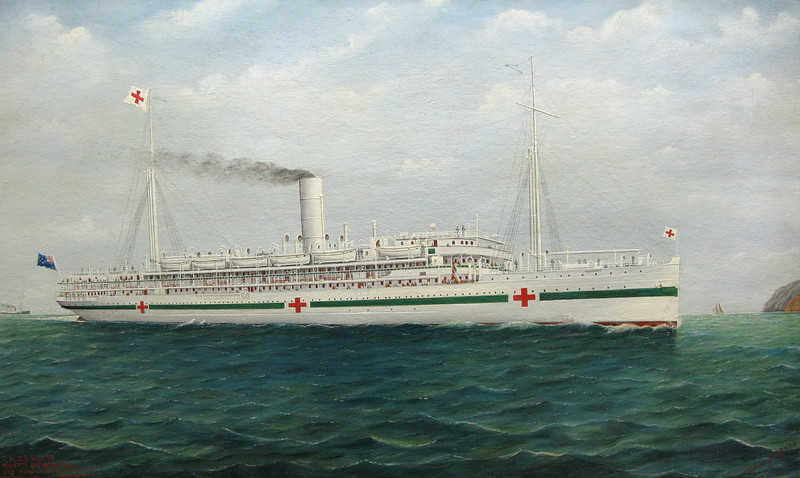
SS Marama, hospital ship Nautilus served as a launch for

==== Battle of the Somme ====
A break in these cross-hemisphere voyages occurred in July 1916, during the Battle of the Somme. Nautilus aided Marama in shuttling wounded soldiers from the trenches across the heavily mined English Channel. Undermanned and at times severely over capacity, Marama and her two launches made 11 trips across the channel, conveying 10,978 Allied soldiers and German prisoners of war over this period.

By 1918, Nautilus had completed her military service and was re-moored along the Avon River / Ōtākaro.

=== Post World War I ===
After World War I, Nautilus was purchased by another New Brighton Power Boat Club member, a baker named Harry Hawker, by 1925. She was used to ferry picnickers along the Ōtākaro River and between Lyttelton, Le Bons Bay and Kaiapoi. During the Great Depression years, she worked as a passenger ferry in Lyttelton Harbour.

At some point, she was also involved in rescuing a survivor from a yachting accident.

In 1994, Nautilus was bought for private use by Allan Williams, a retired businessman and former Consul General to the Honorary German Consulate in Christchurch. She was given a new engine, and used for family excursions.

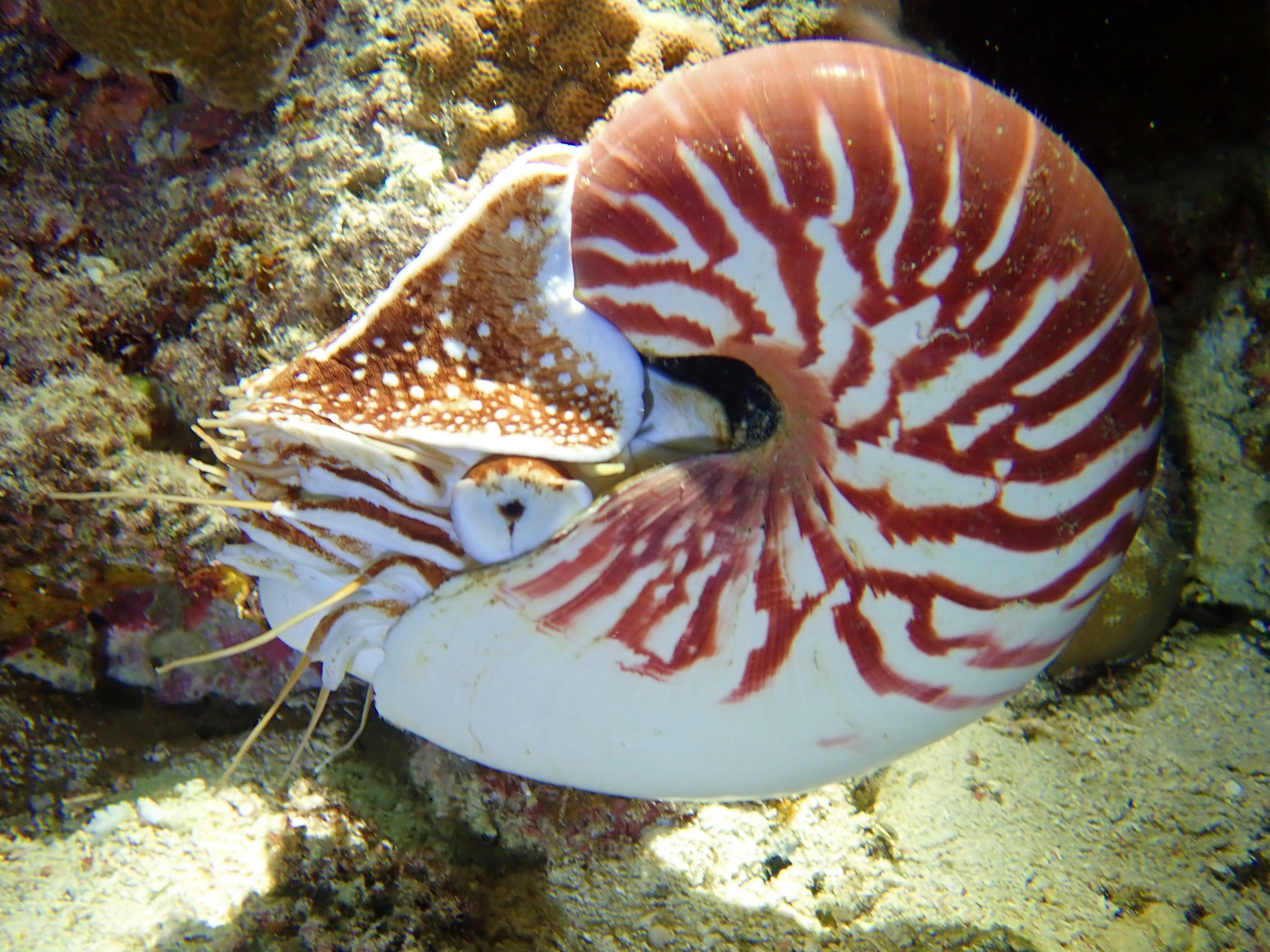
A Nautilus sea creature, namesake of Nautilus (motor launch)

=== New Zealand Maritime Museum ===
The launch was donated to the New Zealand Maritime Museum in November 2011. Museum staff volunteers began her restoration in 2012, taking five years to complete. During the restoration process, her original core was discovered, as well that she had been lengthened from an initial 32 feet to 36.06 feet.

Berthed at Hobson Wharf, the Nautilus is operated by the museum for visitor excursions.

== Historical misconceptions ==
Over the 20th century, Nautilus's service in World War I developed its own mythology. Stories circulated that she had suffered bullet holes while evacuating wounded soldiers from ANZAC cove during the Gallipoli campaign. In reality, Nautilus did not reach the Mediterranean Sea until after the Allied evacuation of the peninsula. Her mothership, SS Marama, never anchored at ANZAC cove or anywhere else on the Gallipoli peninsula during WWI.

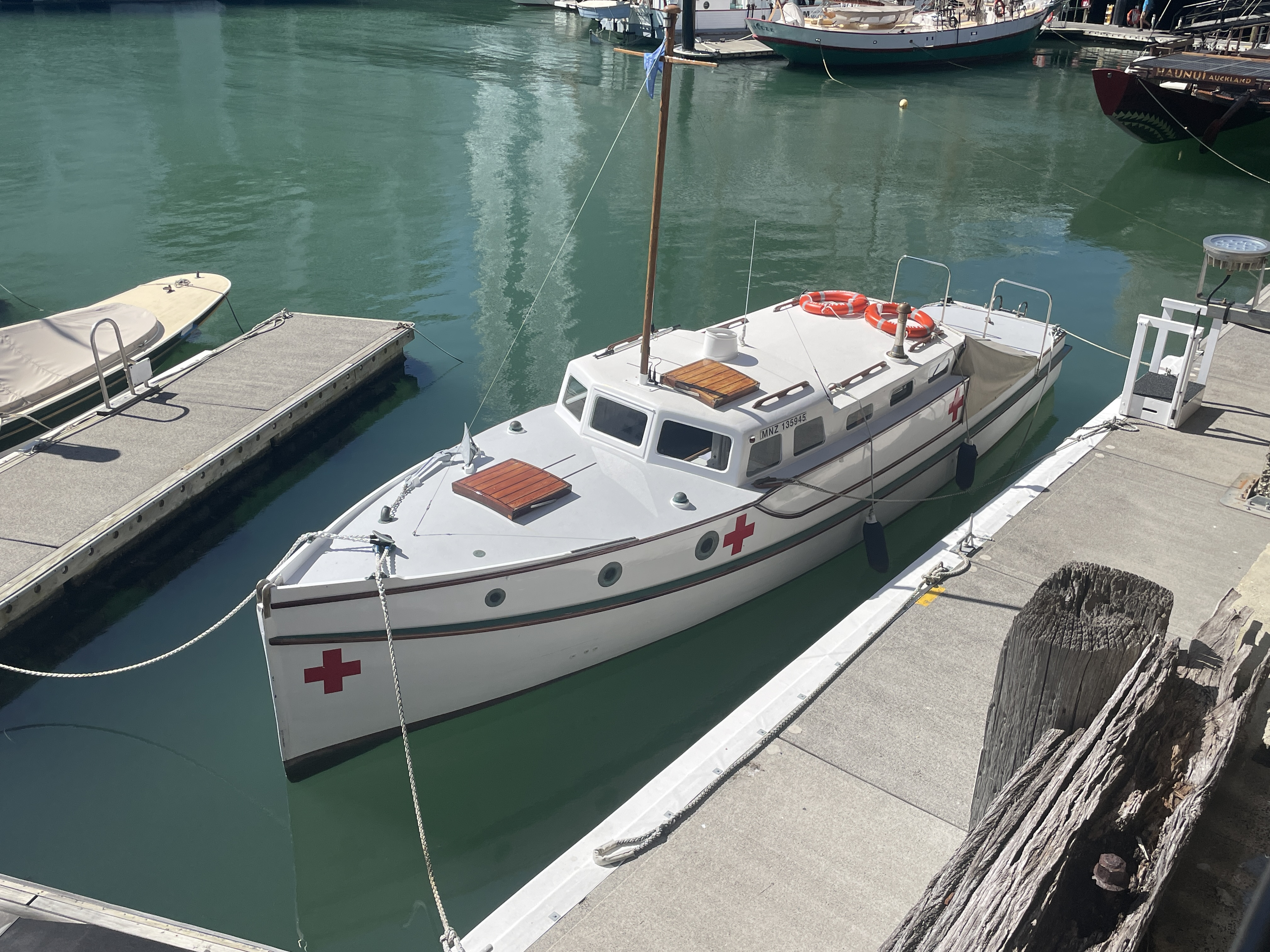
Nautilus berthed at Hobson Wharf

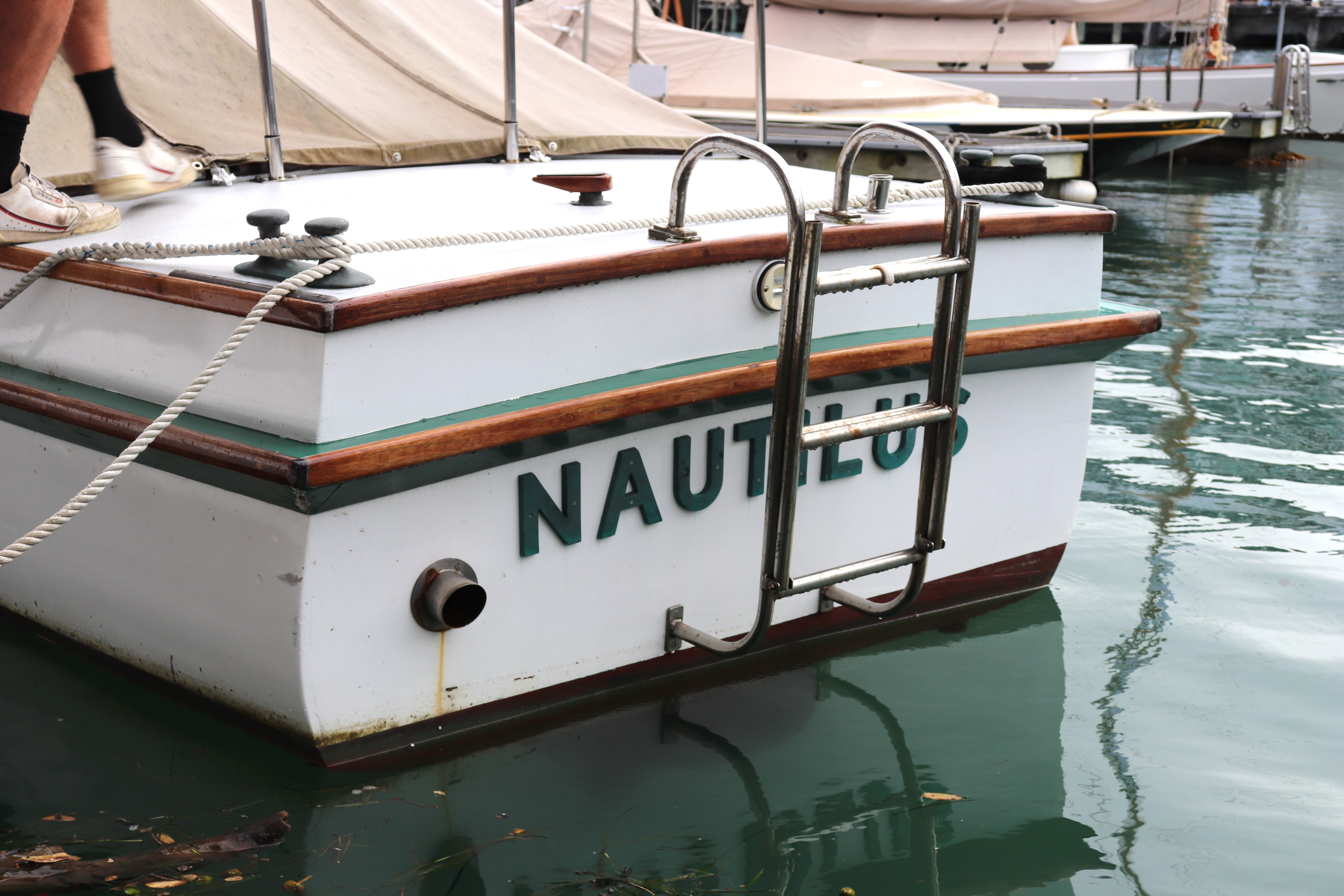
Stern of Nautilus

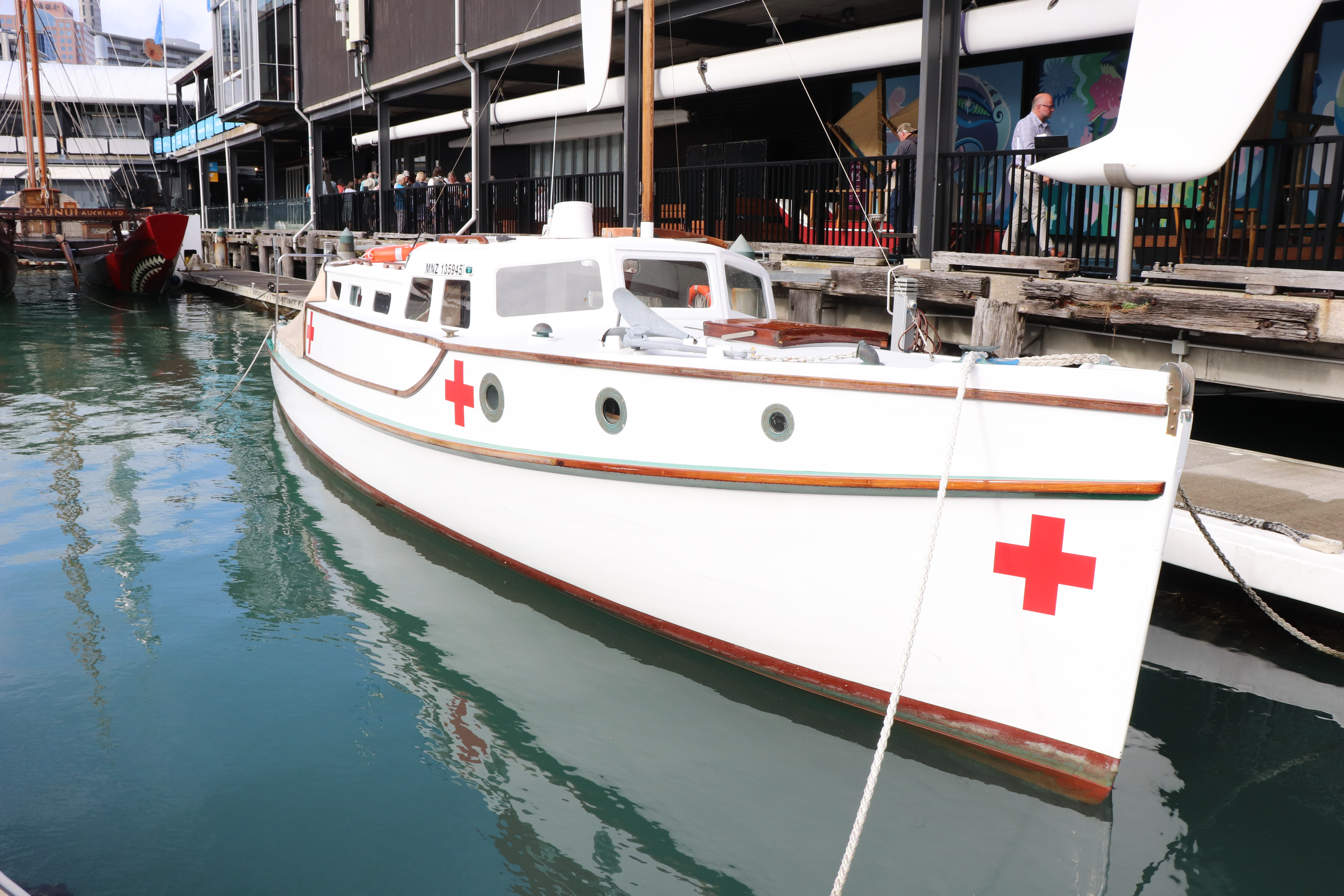
Livery of Nautilus

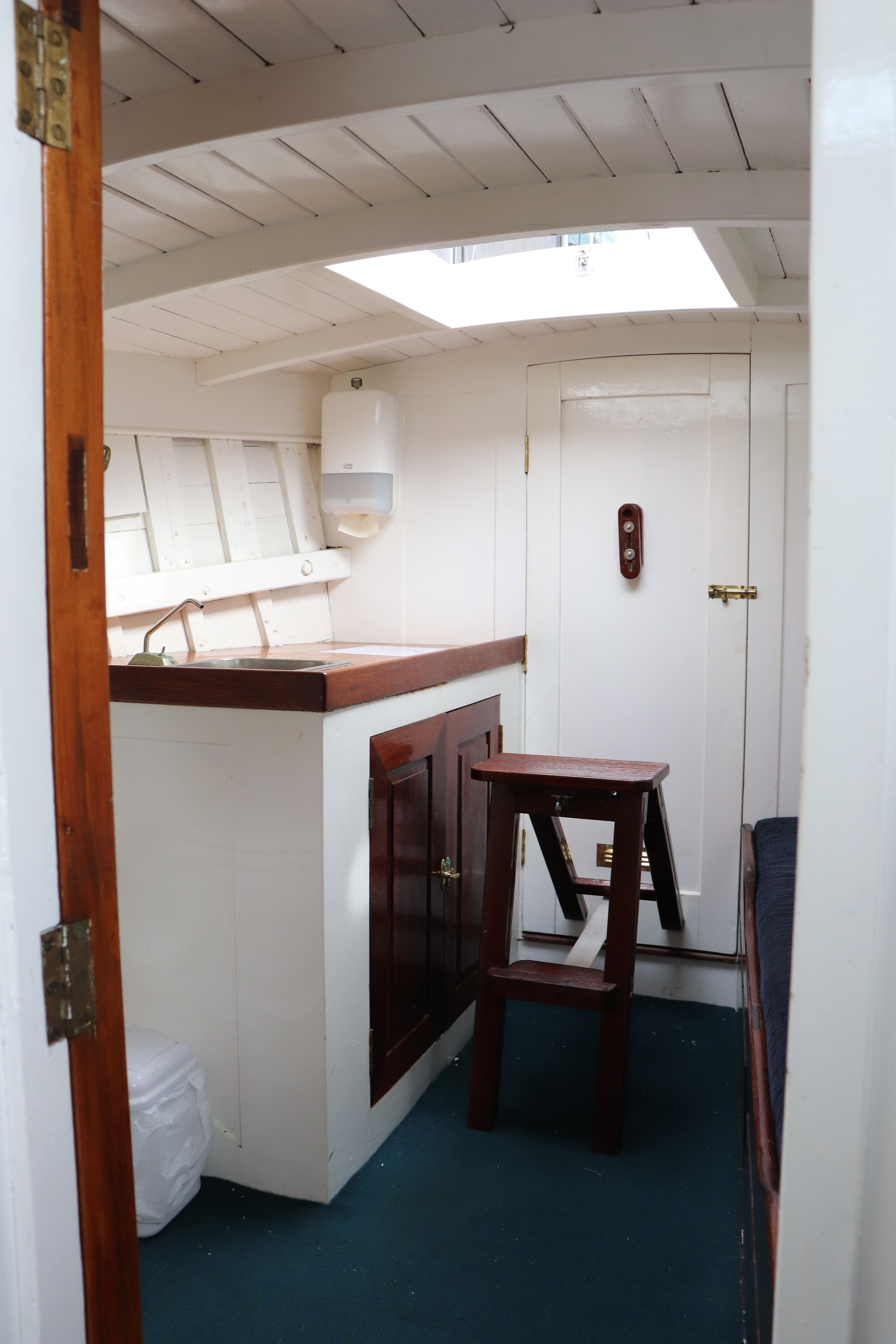
Interior of Nautilus
