= Rodney Wilson (museum director) =

New Zealand art historian

Rodney Wilson CNZM
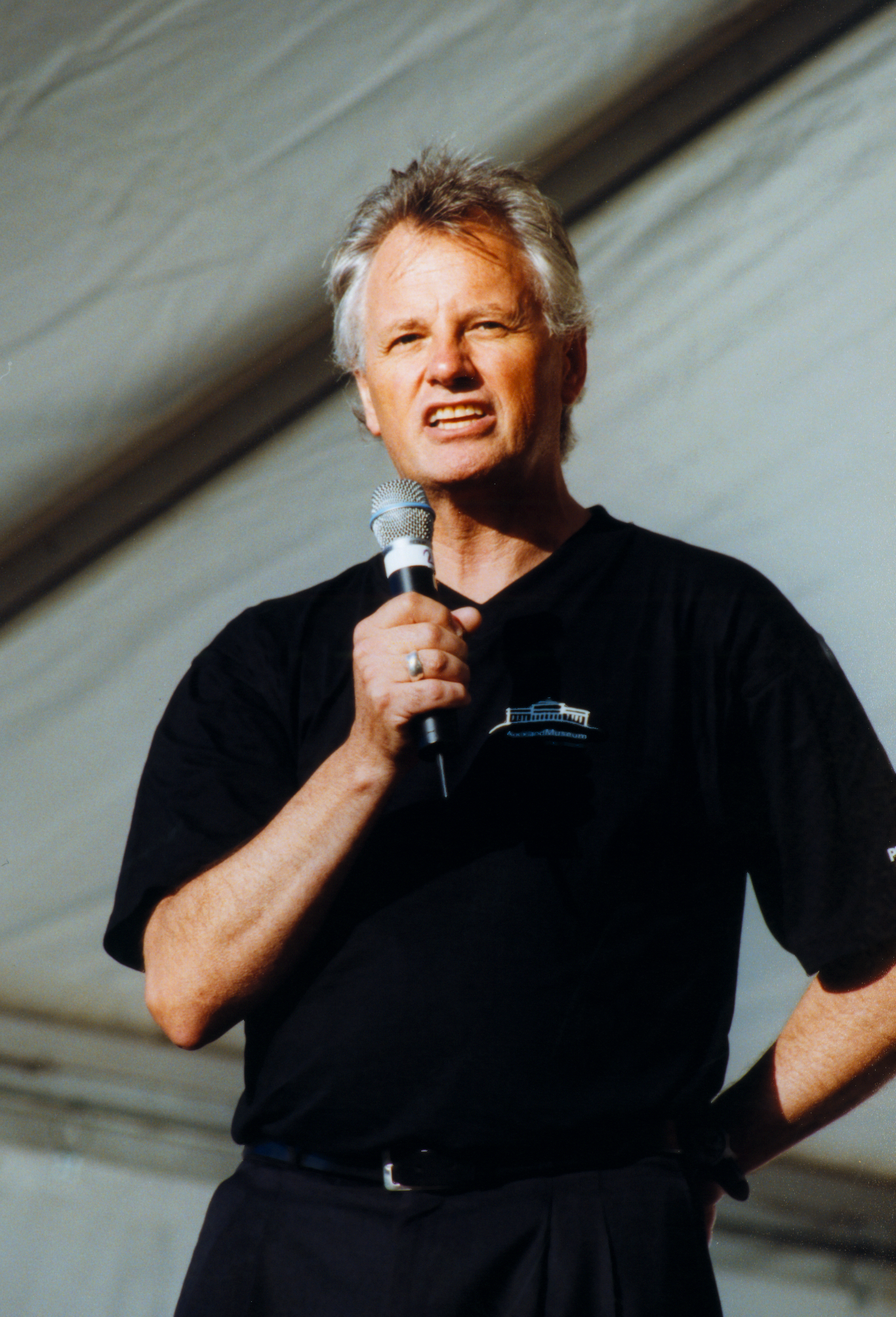
- Rodney Wilson at the Auckland War Memorial Museum in the 1990s
- Born: Thomas Lance Rodney Wilson; 1945; Christchurch, New Zealand
- Died: 27 April 2013 (aged 67–68); Auckland, New Zealand
- Education: University of Canterbury
- Scientific career
- Fields: art history
- Workplaces: Christchurch Art Gallery; Auckland Art Gallery; Auckland War Memorial Museum

Thomas Lance Rodney Wilson CNZM (1945 – 27 April 2013) was a New Zealand art historian and museum professional. He served as director of a number of major New Zealand museums and art galleries, including the Christchurch Art Gallery, Auckland Art Gallery, New Zealand Maritime Museum and Auckland War Memorial Museum.

== Education ==
Wilson was born in Christchurch in 1945. His secondary schooling was at St. Andrew's College in Christchurch. He then studied fine arts at the University of Canterbury in the 1960s.

In the early 1970s he returned to study, gaining a 'doctoraal' in art history from the Katholieke Universiteit (now Radboud University Nijmegen) in The Netherlands. He completed a PhD in art history at the University of Canterbury in the late 1970s.

== Career ==
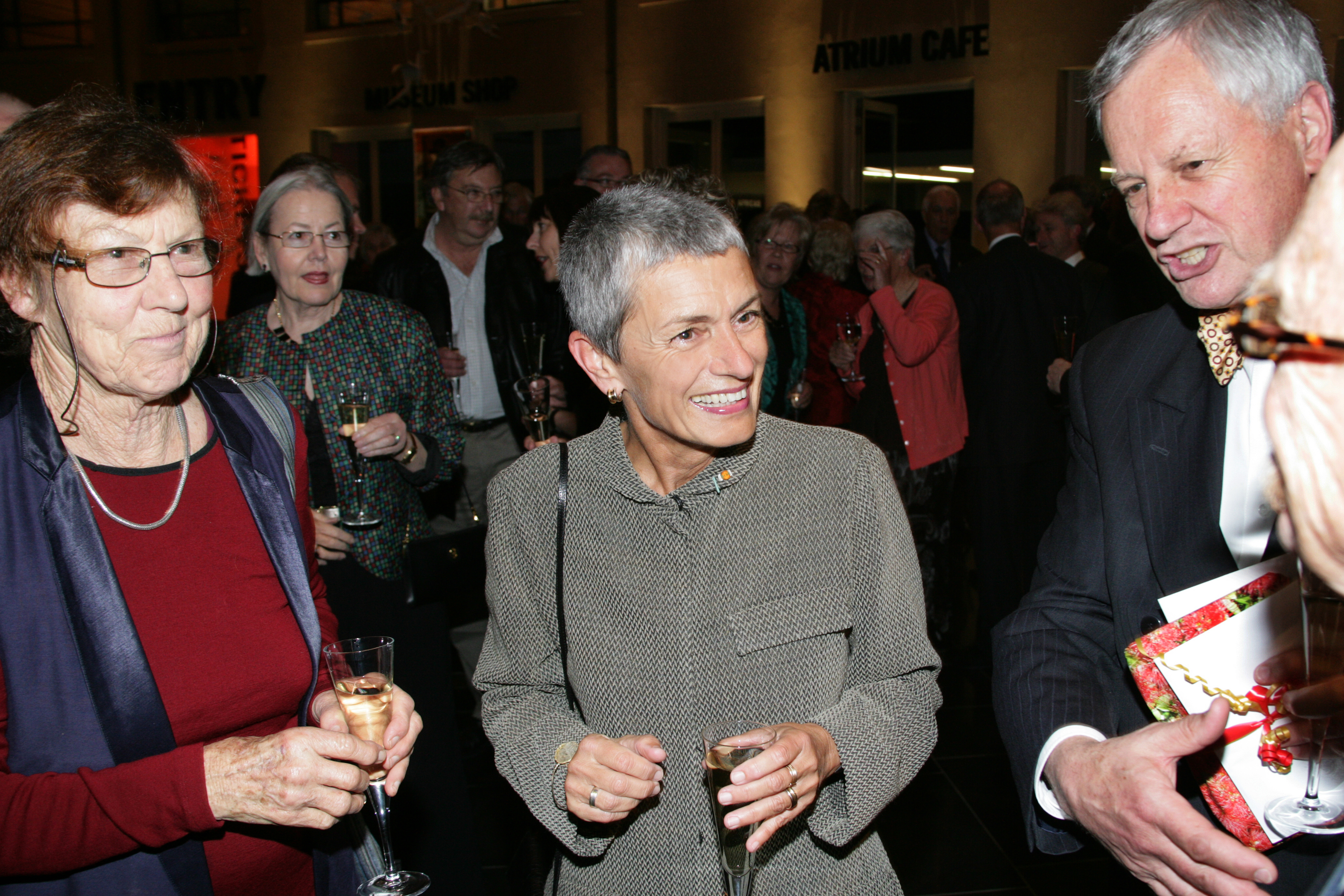
Gil Hanly, Vanda Vitali and Rodney Wilson in 2007

Wilson's first museum role came shortly after leaving the University of Canterbury, when he was appointed director of the Wairarapa Arts Centre in Masterton, a role he left to undertake further study in The Netherlands.

Wilson returned to New Zealand as the first appointee to the new art history department at the University of Canterbury. He taught there for five years while also completing his PhD In November 1978 he was appointed director of Christchurch's Robert McDougall Art Gallery (now the Christchurch Art Gallery. Although he spent only two years at the Gallery several major acquisitions were made during that time, including Ralph Hotere's Malady Panels (1971) and five works by Frances Hodgkins, including Unshatterable / Belgian Refugees(1916).

In 1981 Wilson left Christchurch Art Gallery for the Auckland Art Gallery, where he was director until 1988. Here he led a major building renovation that nearly doubled the gallery's exhibiting space and added an auditorium, two conservation labs, a bookshop and a café, and improved art storage space. He was a member of the organising committee and co-ordinator of the exhibition teams for the international exhibition Te Maori, which toured the United States and New Zealand from 1984 to 1987.

In 1988 Wilson served briefly as the director of the National Gallery of Victoria, but did not enjoy the support of the Premier's office. He returned to New Zealand to establish the New Zealand Maritime Museum in Auckland, serving as founding director from 1989 to 1994.

From 1994 to 2007 Wilson was the director of the Auckland War Memorial Museum. In his time at the museum Wilson lead a $115 million expansion of the museum building that created a 60% increase in floor space.

Wilson was also a governor of the Arts Foundation of New Zealand from 2002 to 2010. He died in Auckland on 27 April 2013.

== Publications ==
Wilson was a leading scholar on Dutch painter Petrus van der Velden. His doctoral thesis on Van der Velden was published in 1979 as a two-volume catalogue raisonné. An unfinished catalogue raisonné on New Zealand painter Frances Hodgkins was deposited with the E H McCormick Research Library at the Auckland Art Gallery.

- T.L. Rodney Wilson, Petrus Van der Velden (1837–1913), Wellington: Reed, 1976. ISBN 0589009893
- T.L. Rodney Wilson, Petrus van der Velden (1837–1913) : a catalogue raisonné, Sydney : Chancery Chambers, 1979.
- Melinda Johnston with T.L. Rodney Wilson, Lateral inversions : the prints of Barry Cleavin, Christchurch: Canterbury University Press, 2013. ISBN 9781927145470

== Awards and recognitions ==
- 2006: Named by The New Zealand Herald as a 'New Zealander of the Year'.
- 2007: Appointed a Fellow of Museums Aotearoa
- 2007: Appointed Companion of the New Zealand Order of Merit.

== Further information ==
- Hamish Keith interviews Rodney Wilson, Cultural Icons series
