= New Zealand Maritime Museum =

New Zealand Maritime Museum Hui Te Ananui a Tangaroa
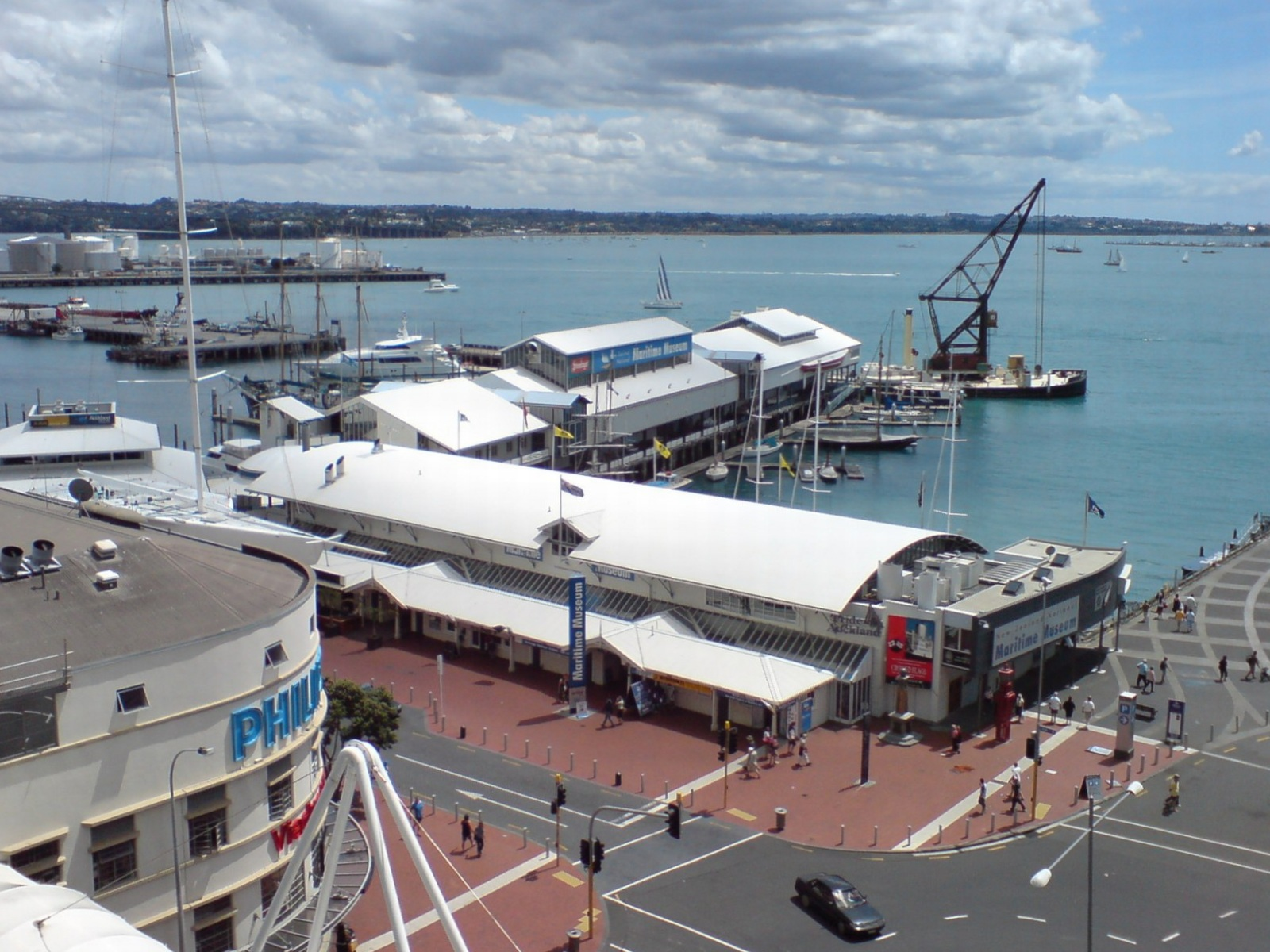
- New Zealand Maritime Museum in 2006
- Former name: Hobson Wharf: Auckland Maritime Museum; New Zealand National Maritime Museum; Voyager New Zealand Maritime Museum
- Established: 1993; 33 years ago
- Location: Corner Quay Street and Hobson Street, Auckland waterfront, New Zealand
- Coordinates: 36.8417°S 174.7634°E
- Type: Maritime museum
- CEO: Vincent Lipanovich
- Owners: Tātaki Auckland Unlimited, Auckland Council (indirectly through Auckland Unlimited)
- Public transit access: Waitematā Station, Auckland Ferry Terminal
- Website: www.maritimemuseum.co.nz

The New Zealand Maritime Museum Hui Te Ananui a Tangaroa is a maritime museum in Auckland, New Zealand. It is located on Hobson Wharf, adjacent to the Viaduct Harbour in central Auckland. It houses exhibitions spanning New Zealand's maritime history, from the first Polynesian explorers and settlers to modern day triumphs at the America's Cup.

== Scope ==
The museum focuses on maritime stories of both the Auckland Region and New Zealand, with displays covering topics including immigration, trade, design, innovation, leisure, maritime history, Polynesian voyagers, and the history of the America's Cup. In addition to displays and art exhibitions, the New Zealand Maritime Museum collections include historic and cultural artifacts, replicas and working heritage vessels.

== Location ==
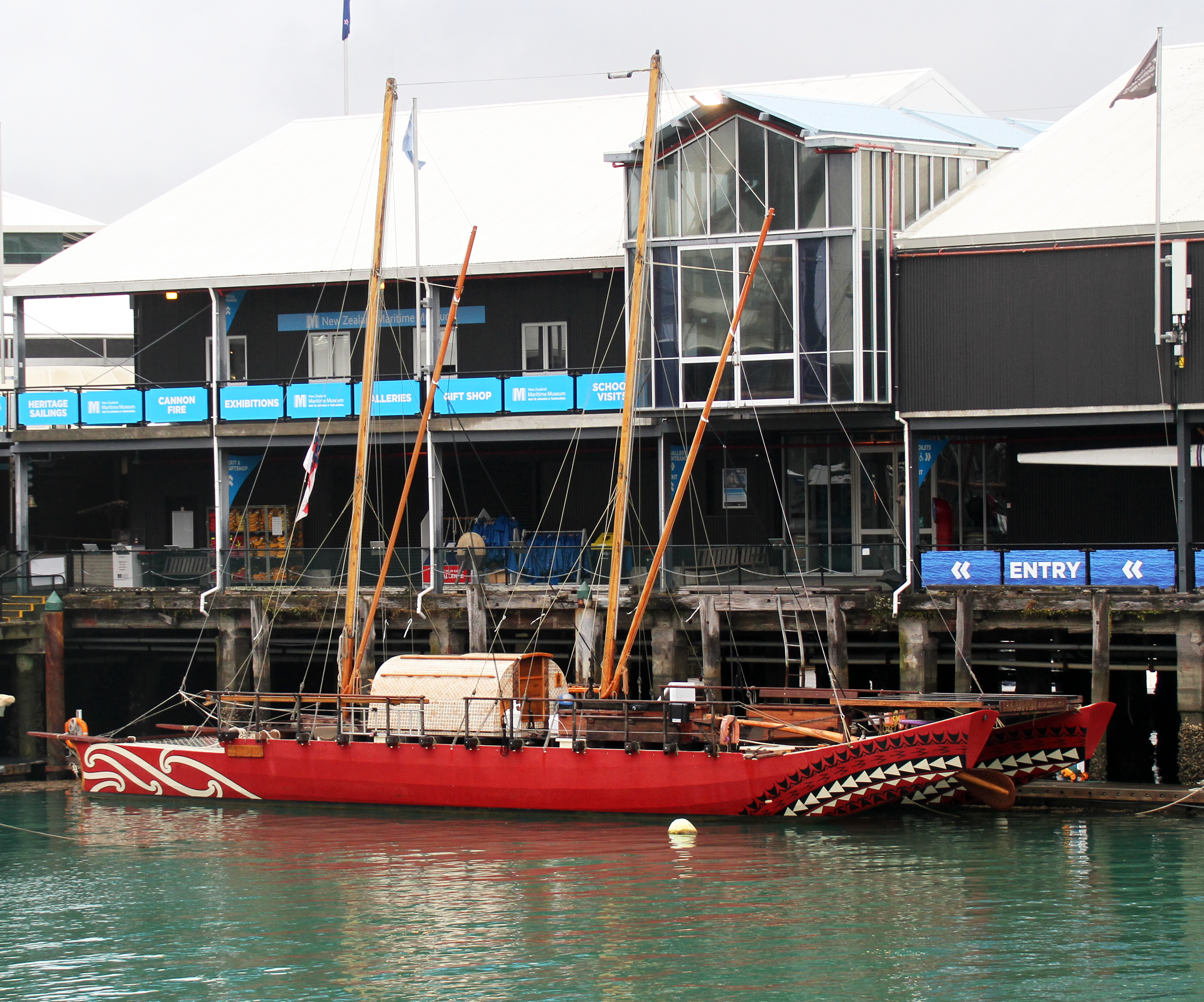
The waka Haunui, a reconstructed Polynesian double hulled ocean-going canoe berthed at Hobson Wharf next to the museum

The New Zealand Maritime Museum is located on Hobson Wharf on the Auckland waterfront, adjacent to the Viaduct Basin and Princes Wharf. The entrance of the museum incorporates the Launchman's Building, a structure built in 1920 which formerly housed a number of small boating companies. The old Launchman's Building (Launch Offices) gained a Category II listing from Heritage New Zealand in 1981. The main section of the maritime museum in an industrial-inspired structure located on Hobson Wharf. Heritage vessels owned by the museum are moored at the museum marina, and launched for sailings around the Waitematā Harbour. In 2010, the building won the Auckland Architecture Awards by the New Zealand Institute of Architects. Located outside of the Maritime Museum's entrance is KZ1, a yacht built to compete in the 1988 America's Cup, gifted to the museum by Fay Richwhite in 1990.

== Name ==
Currently known as New Zealand Maritime Museum Hui Te Ananui a Tangaroa, the museum opened in 1993 as Hobson Wharf: Auckland Maritime Museum. In 1996, the museum was renamed the New Zealand National Maritime Museum, a name given by Prime Minister Jim Bolger. The museum rebranded as Voyager New Zealand Maritime Museum in November 2009, in order to reflect the museum's focus on exploration and discovery. The organisation's current name, New Zealand Maritime Museum Hui Te Ananui a Tangaroa, was adopted in 2014.

The organisation's Māori language name, Hui te Ananui a Tangaroa, was gifted by Hugh Kāwharu of Ngāti Whātua Ōrākei, and means "the Dwelling of Tangaroa", the atua of the oceans.

== History ==
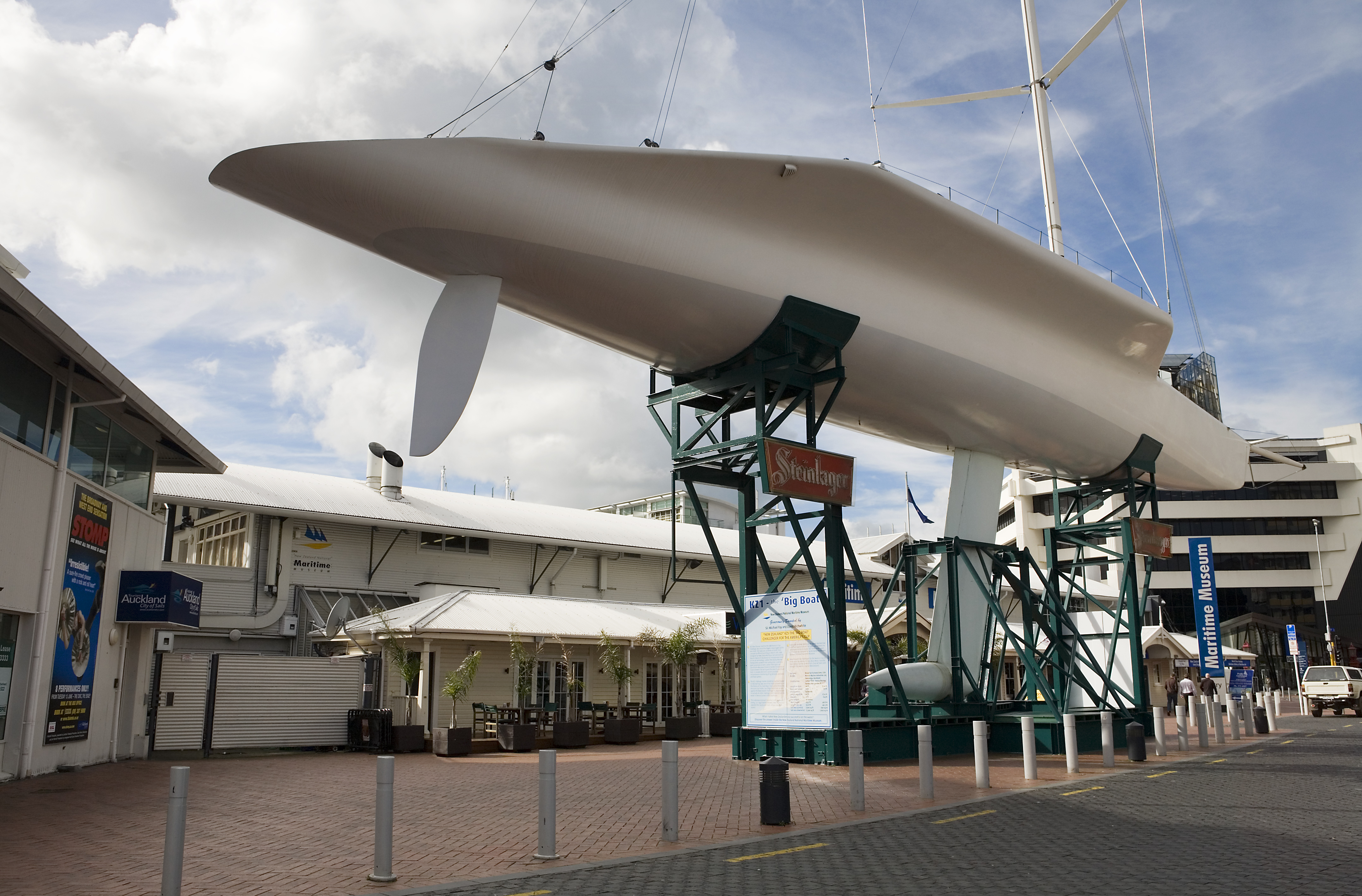
KZ1 at the entrance of the maritime museum in 2006

The establishment of a maritime history museum in Auckland began as a proposal by members of the Auckland Maritime Society, including Bill Laxon, Bob Hawkins, Cliff Hawkins and John Street, and by former members of the Auckland Harbour Board and Union Steam Ship Company. The society had been established in 1958 as a section of the Auckland Institute and Museum, focused on promoting the study of ships. In 1973, the society explored the possibility of establishing a maritime museum on the shores of Lake Pupuke, which was found to be unsuitable. In November 1981, the Auckland Maritime Museum was established as a charitable trust. The Auckland Ferry Terminal, where the museum had been storing archival materials, was explored as a potential site for the museum, but due to the cost of renovations this was decided against.

In 1984, the museum appointed a director, Gordon Stevenson, former director of the Queen Elizabeth II Army Memorial Museum, and had begun exploring the possibility of using sheds on Princes Wharf. Plans for a smaller Princes Wharf museum were halted when the Auckland Harbour Board decided to redevelop Hobson Wharf, with the museum becoming a major part of the redevelopment.

In 1989, Rodney Wilson was appointed as the new director for the museum, who led fundraising efforts to establish the institution. Plans for the museum at Hobson Wharf were announced in February 1989, with construction on the museum beginning in mid-1992.

The museum opened in August 1993, at an estimated cost of NZ$11.1 million. Many of the early maritime collections were long-term loans from Auckland War Memorial Museum, or donated items by members of the Auckland Maritime Society. While originally focusing on Auckland, the museum later expanded to become a national maritime museum.

By 1996, financial difficulties led to staff redundancies at the museum, with museum director Richard Cassels resigning during the financial difficulties in 1998. In 2001, the New Zealand Government funded the Pacific Discovery Experience, a virtual reality exhibition depicting both the discovery of New Zealand by Polynesian peoples, and the later discovery by Europeans.

A NZ$8 million extension to the northern end of the museum was built in 2009 to house a permanent exhibition, Blue Water, Black Magic, about Sir Peter Blake. It includes the original NZL 32 (Black Magic). Blue Water, Black Magic was developed in collaboration with Te Papa and Blake's daughter Sarah-Jane Blake.

In 2010, an extension was added to the museum, housing an exhibition to New Zealand yachting which includes NZL 32, the yacht which won the 1995 America's Cup, suspended in the centre of the space. By 2018, the museum received approximately 160,000 annual visitors.

== Governance, funding and structure ==
The museum was run by New Zealand National Maritime Museum Trust Board until March 2018, when it became a part of Regional Facilities Auckland, an Auckland Council-controlled organisation. The organisation is now run by Tātaki Auckland Unlimited, the economic development agency of Auckland.

In 2008, the Auckland Regional Amenities Funding Act was established, which ensured that funding for the New Zealand Maritime Museum was spread across all local councils in the Auckland Region. As of 2021, funding for the organisation primarily comes from the Auckland Council.

The first director of the Auckland Maritime Museum Trust was Gordon Stevenson, who was employed in January 1985. Rodney Wilson became the museum director in 1989, who was the director of the museum when it opened in 1993. In 1994, Wilson left to become the director of the Auckland War Memorial Museum. Wilson was replaced by Richard Cassels in the same year, who left in 1998. Cassels was followed by chief executive Larry Robbins in 1999, Craig Hobbs in 2007, and Paul Evans in 2008. By 2013, Murray Reade had become the chief executive officer. In 2013, former director of Toitū Otago Settlers Museum, Linda Wigley, became the director of the maritime museum, overseeing the redevelopment of the museum until her resignation in June 2014. The current director of the maritime museum, Vincent Lipanovich, has held the position since 2015.

In 2018, the institution had 166 volunteers, working as tour guides, maintenance and operational crew for heritage vessels, model makers and learning programme assistants. Since 2003, personnel from the Royal New Zealand Navy have been occasionally seconded to the museum to assist with maintenance of the ships and exhibition objects.

== Exhibitions and facilities ==
- Bill Laxon Maritime Library. The library is supported through funding by the Maritime Museum Foundation. The library operates the New Zealand Maritime Index, formerly operated the New Zealand Maritime Record, and formerly a website documenting the Northern Steamship Company.
- Blue Water, Black Magic, a permanent exhibition to Peter Blake, which includes the original NZL 32 (Black Magic).
- Changing Waterfront, a set of two interactive dioramas constructed by Stuart Weekes in 2017. The dioramas show two scenes of the Auckland waterfront, one circa 1900 and one circa 2000.
- Coastal Trade gallery, which includes a recreation of the port of Auckland in the early 1900s, a facade of Northern Steamship Company building, and a model of the 1886 cutter Rewa.
- Edmiston Gallery. Originally funded by the Edmiston Trust, the gallery showcases temporary exhibitions relating to maritime artworks.
- Hall of Yachting, which showcases locally designed and produced sailing dinghies, such as the Flying Ant, the Mistral, the Starling, the Sunburst and the Idle Along.
- Hawaiki Gallery, which includes oceanic craft, including Tavaka, a two-man outrigger canoe that was constructed for the museum by Futunan boatbuilder Lishi Nakali in 1994.
- The Immigrants, an exhibition exploring migration from different perspectives, includes stories of Pasifika, Māori, European and Chinese immigration experiences to New Zealand. The exhibition replaced an earlier immigration exhibition in 2010.
- The Maritime Room, a convention and events space.
- Oceans Apart Gallery, which includes a model of the QSMV Dominion Monarch.

In addition, the museum holds collection items focusing on subjects including whaling, modern commercial shipping, lifeboat, pilotage and coastguard services, marine surveying, maritime arts and crafts and maritime recreation.

=== Seaworthy ships ===
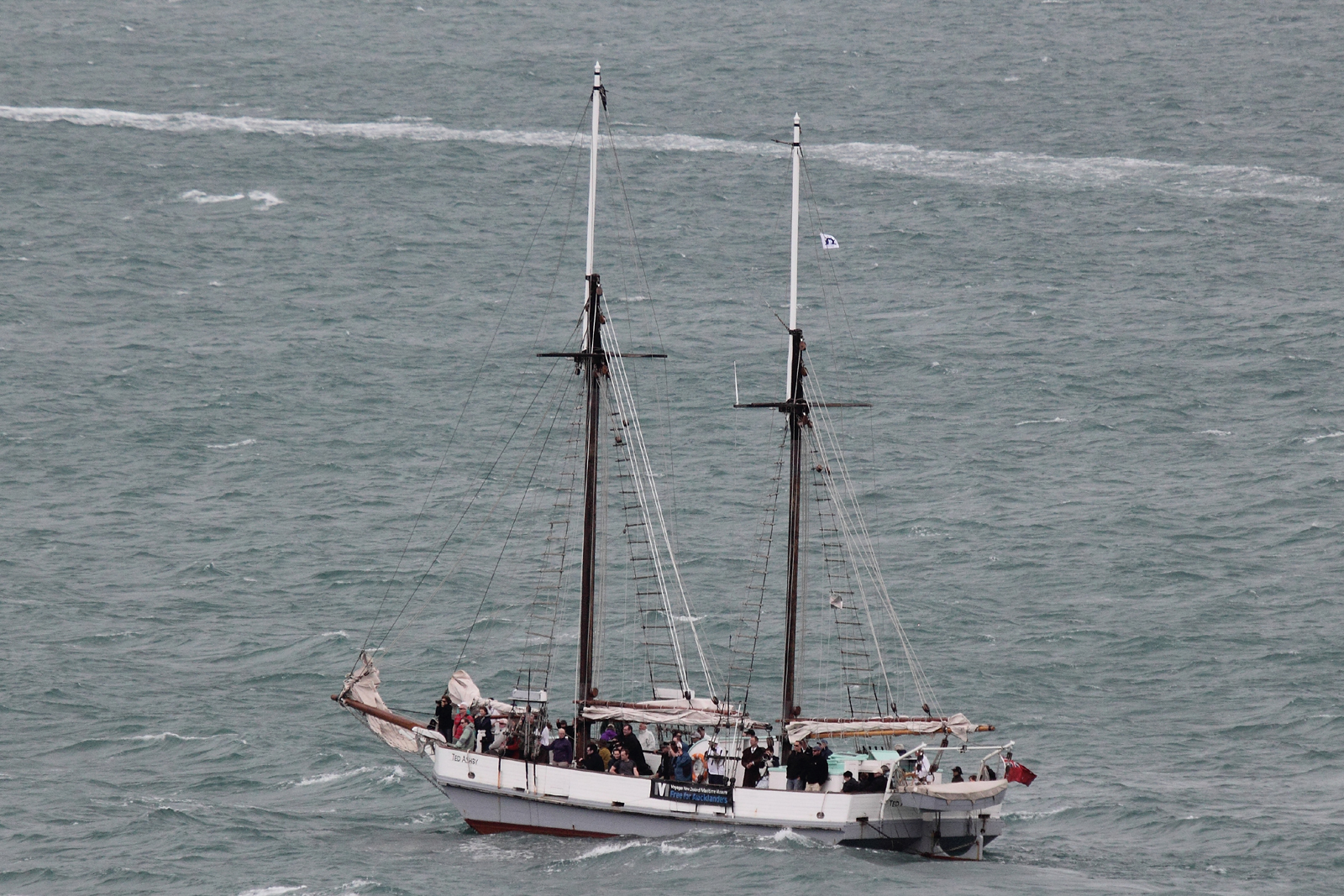
The Ted Ashby during an excursion onto the Waitematā Harbour

The museum also owns a number of vessels that are normally berthed outside of the museum:

- Ted Ashby, reproduction of ketch-rigged scow typical of late 19th century northern New Zealand vessels, that was purpose-built for the museum in 1993. Ted Ashby has public sailings every day except Monday.
- Breeze, a 1981 reproduction of a brigantine for New Zealand coastal trade. The Breeze was sailed to Moruroa and Tahiti in 1995, as a protest against French nuclear weapons testing in the Pacific Ocean.
- Nautilus, a 1912 motor launch, which formerly operated as a ferry for the Avon River / Ōtākaro in Christchurch, and a ferry for wounded soldiers during the Battle of the Somme in World War I.
- S. S. Puke, late 19th century steam engine tender for coastal and river logging trade. The vessel was launched in 1872, and in 1977 was salvaged from the Tāmaki River and restored by enthusiasts.

The museum also operates Aotearoa One, launched 2013, described on the museum's website as "a modern take on a traditional waka", which no longer has scheduled sailings. The museum previously operated the Rapaki steam crane, a 1926 floating steam crane, built at Paisley in Scotland for the Lyttelton Harbour Board, which was permanently removed and dismantled in December 2018. The vessel had been used in active service for three years during World War II, being used to support the United States Navy at New Caledonia.

== Collections ==
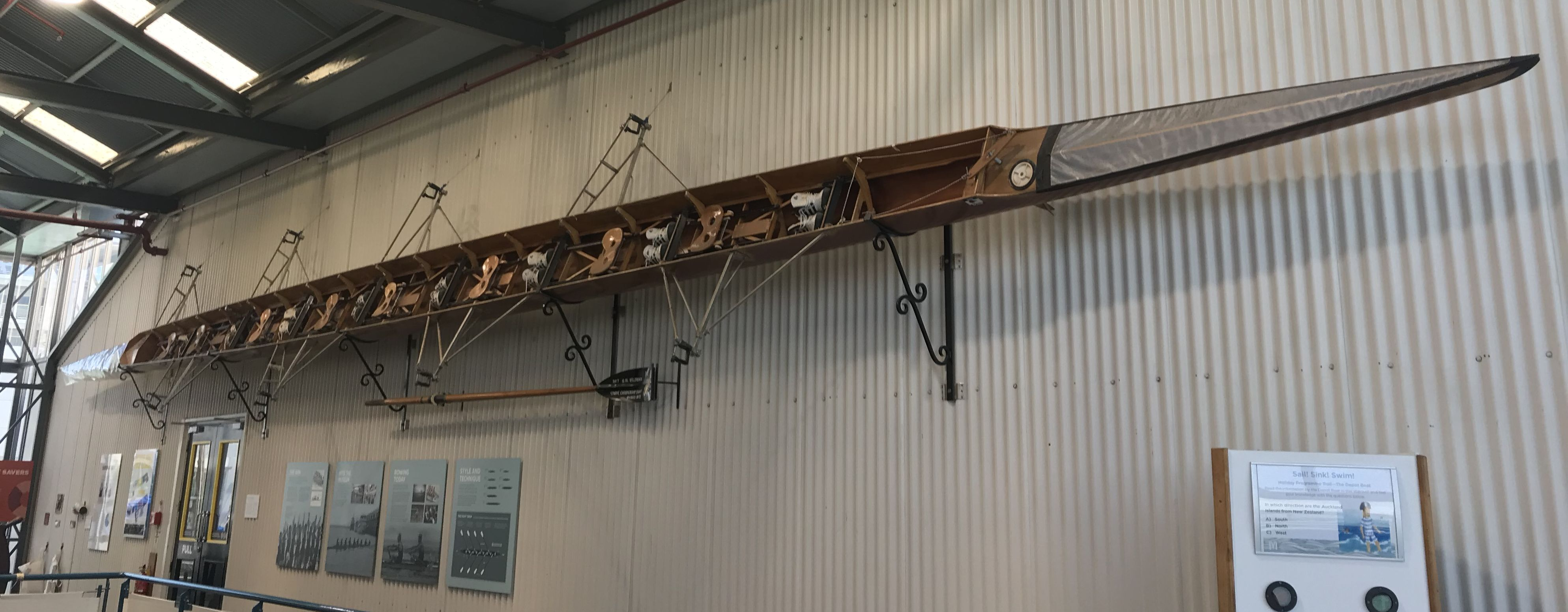
The 1972 Karlisch rowing boat used by the 1972 New Zealand eight

The museum has a collection of over 130 watercraft, including the 1933 John L. Hacker-designed mahogany and kauri speedboat Jon-El, The Frances, an early 20th century vessel owned by the Shakespear family, and Paul Caffyn's kayak Isadora. Other vessels include the Tainui, an 1860 whaling vessel, P-class sailing dinghies designed by Harry Highet, Mammoth, a moth-class dinghy, and the Karlich hull used by Olympic Gold medalist rowers, the 1972 New Zealand eight. Tatarai, a Baurua voyager canoe from Kiribati built in 1976 by Kiribati islanders and photographer Jim Siers using traditional methods, and sailed from Kiribati to Fiji in 1976, is also held in the museum's collections.

Other collection items include the original iron ballast from HMS Endeavour, the anchor of the HMS Bounty, the preserved wheelhouse of the Devonport Steam Ferry Company vessel Takapuna (1924), a mauri stone from Motungārara Island / Fishermans Island near Kapiti Island, and the majority of the former photographic collections of the Wellington Maritime Museum.

== Gallery ==
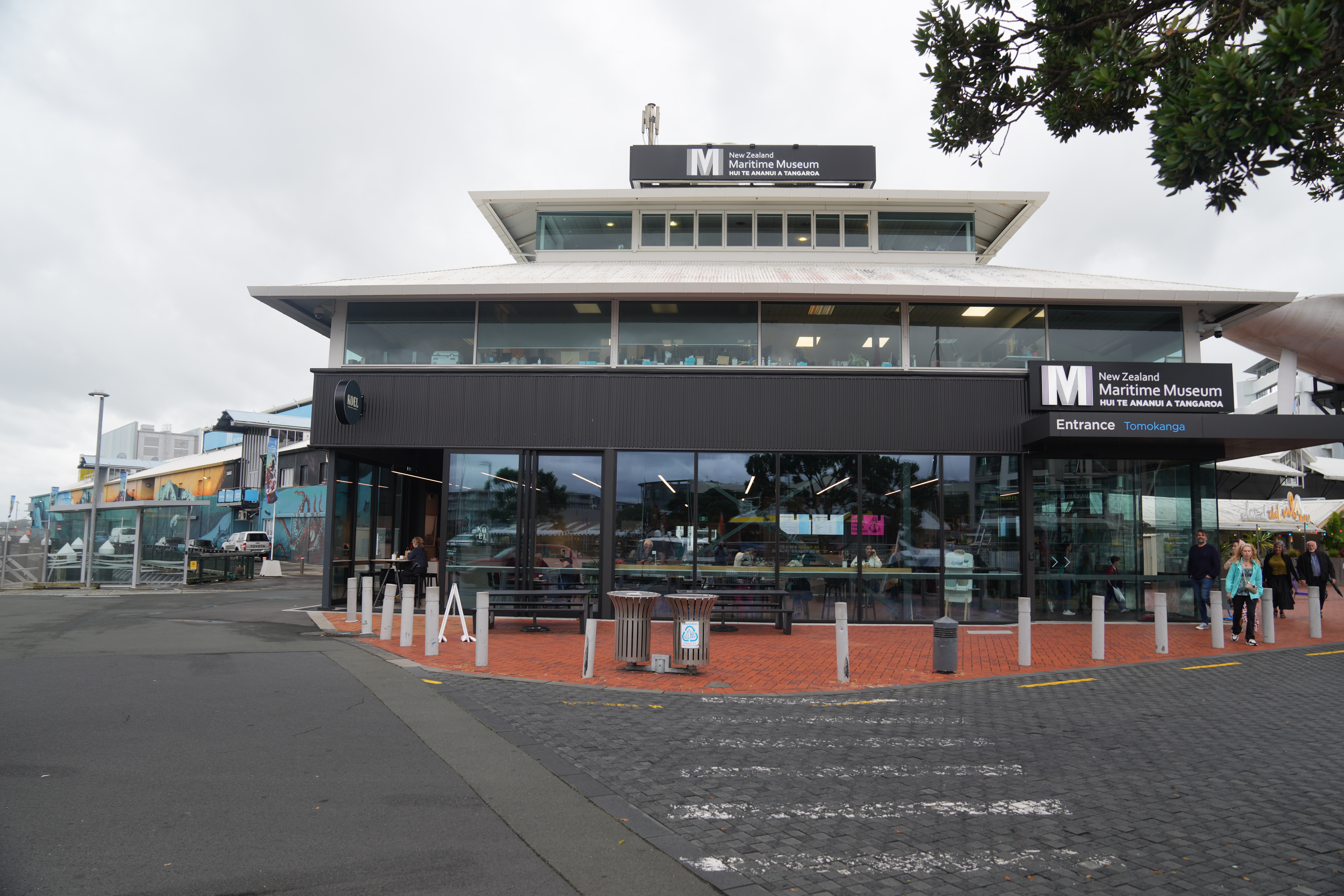
New Zealand Maritime Museum HUITE ANANUTA TANGAROA

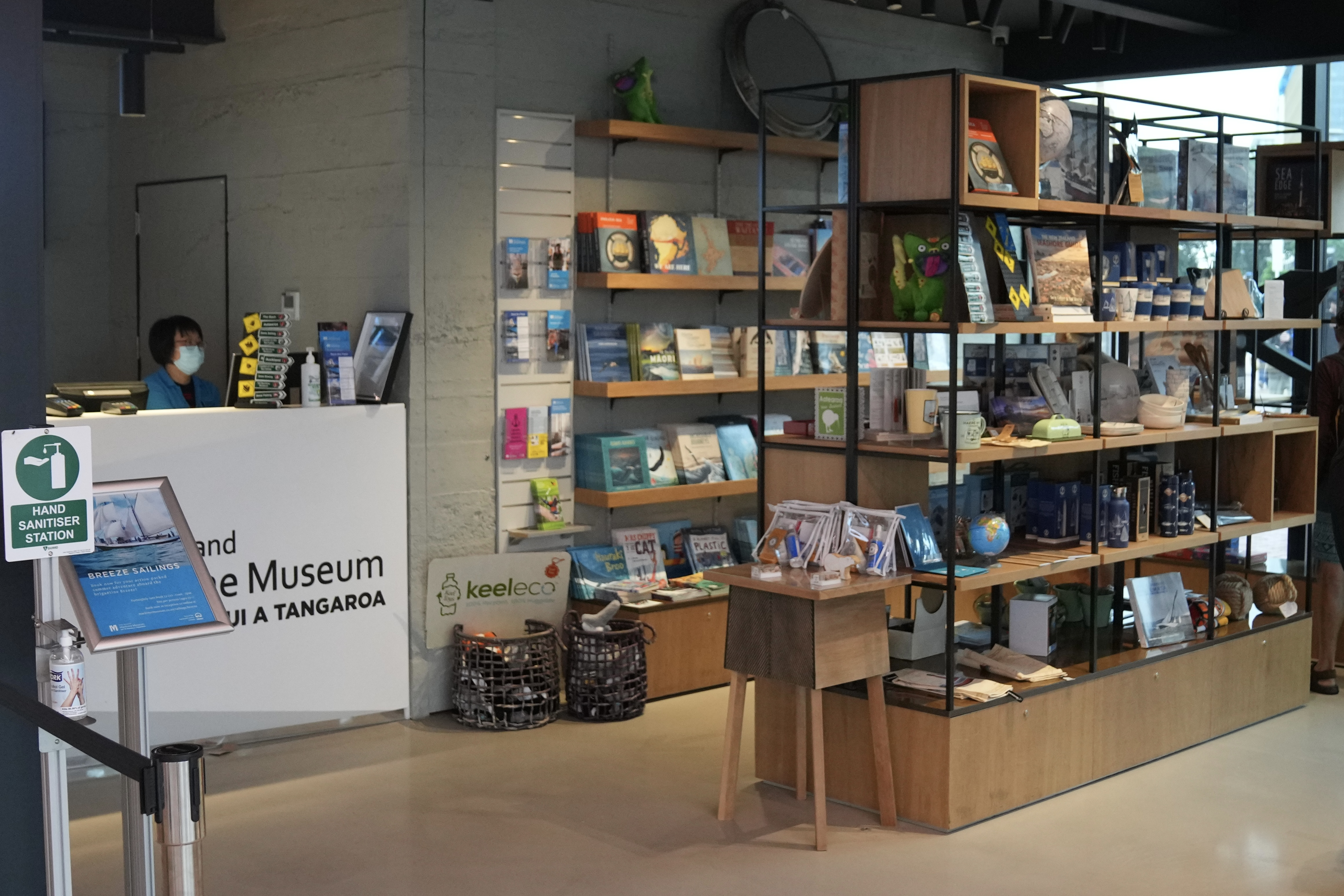
New Zealand Maritime Museum Gift shop

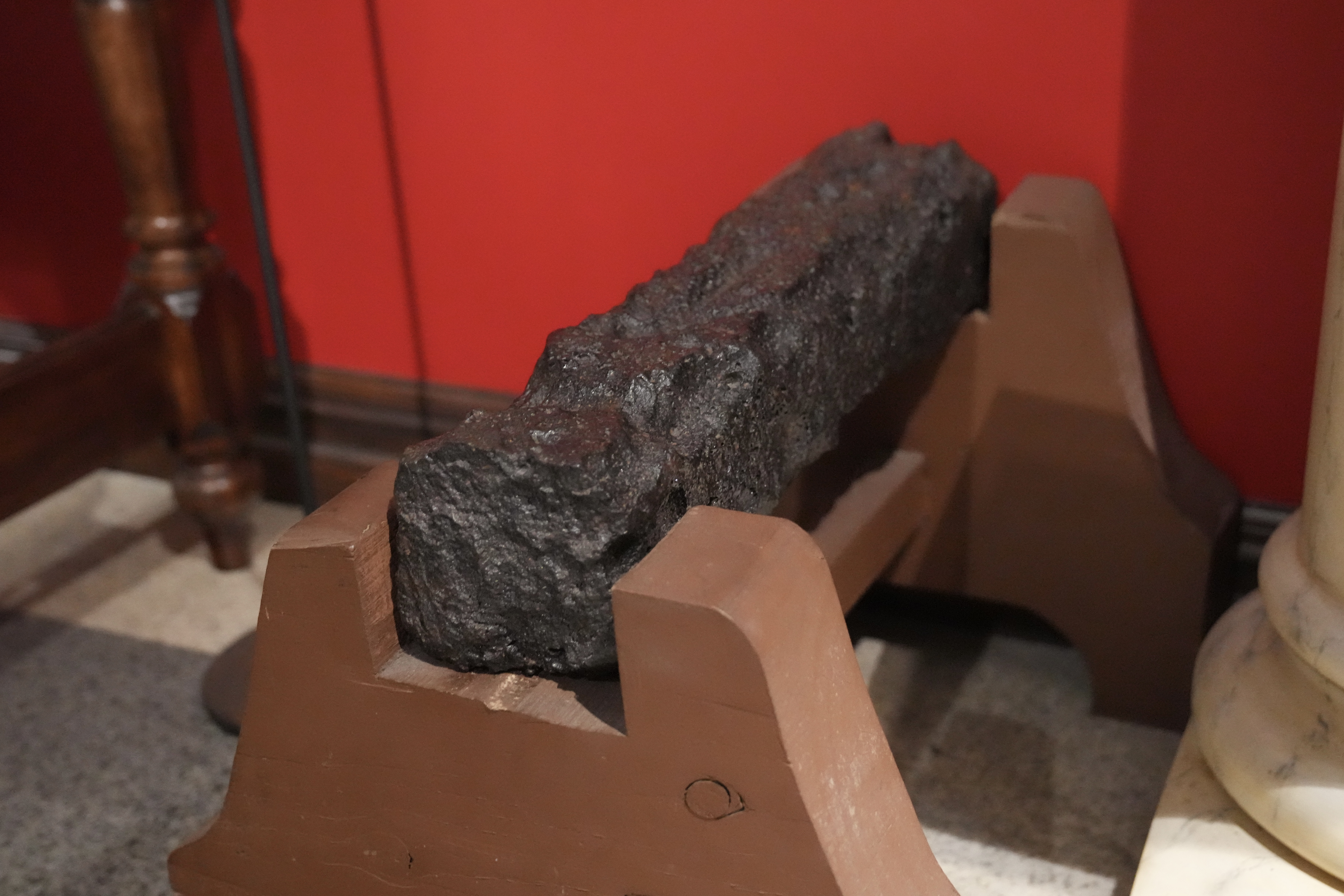
Pig iron ballast from Captain James Cook's HM Bark Endeavour in the New Zealand Maritime Museum. This piece of ballast was recovered from the Great Barrier Reef in Australia, where Endeavour had gone aground in 1770.

== Bibliography ==
- Introducing the New Zealand National Maritime Museum. New Zealand National Maritime Museum. March 2002. ISBN 0-9582022-2-2.
- Walsh, Frances (2020). Endless Sea: Stories Told Through the Taonga of the New Zealand Maritime Museum Hui Te Ananui a Tangaroa. Massey University Press. ISBN 978-0-9951318-7-3.
